2022 in sports describes the year's events in world sports. The main events for this year were the 2022 Winter Olympic Games in Beijing and the 2022 FIFA World Cup in Qatar.

Multi-sport events 
 January 22–28: 2022 Special Olympics World Winter Games in Kazan, Russia  Cancelled
February 4–20: 2022 Winter Olympics, in Beijing, China 
March 4–13: 2022 Winter Paralympics, in Beijing, China  
April 16–22: 2020 Invictus Games, in The Hague, Netherlands 
April 22 – May 8: 2022 Central American and Caribbean Games, in  San Salvador, El Salvador (Postponed to 2023)
May 12–23: 2021 Southeast Asian Games in Hanoi, Vietnam 
May 13–29: 2021 World Masters Games in Kansai, Japan 
May 16–31: GCC Games – 
June 25 – July 5: 2022 Mediterranean Games in Oran, Algeria 
July 7–17: 2022 World Games in Birmingham, United States 
July 28 – August 8: 2022 Commonwealth Games, in Birmingham, England 
October 1–15: 2022 South American Games, in Asunción, Paraguay 
April 28 – May 8: 2022 South American Youth Games in Rosario, Argentina 
December 20–28: 2021 Asian Youth Games in Shantou, China  Cancelled
July 24–30: 2022 European Youth Summer Olympic Festival in Banská Bystrica, Slovakia 
 2022 Children Games of Asia – 
 2022 West Asian Para Games – 
 2022 FISU Combat Games – 
 2022 World Combat Games –  Cancelled
 2022 World Masters Games –  Cancelled
 2022 World Police and Fire Games – 
 2022 World Firefighters Games – 
 2022 Winter Military World Games –  Cancelled
 2022 Cadets Military World Games –  Cancelled
 2022 World Nomad Games – 
 2022 ISF World Schools Games – 
 2022 ASEAN University Games –  26 July–6 August 2022
 2022 INAS European Games
 2022 INAS Asian Games
 2022 INAS African Games
 2022 INAS American Games
 2022 MED Senior Games
 2022 World Medi Games
 2022 European Open Trisome Games
 2022 International Children's Games
 2022 IWAS World Games – 
 European Heart and Lung Transplant Championships 2022 / 6–11 June 2022 / Belgium
 European Transplant and Dialysis Sports Games 2022 / 21–28 August 2022 / Oxford, UK
 Transplant Games of America / 29 July – 3 August 2022 / USA (San Diego)
 2022 Invictus Games
 2022 Arab University Games
 2022 International Youth Games
 2022 ASEAN Para Games
 2022 World Aquatics Championships
 2022 FIA Motorsport Games
 2022 Maccabiah Games
 2022 Mediterranean Games
 2022 Sukma Games
 2022 South American Games
 2022 European Company Sports Games of Summer
 2022 European Company Sports Games of Winter
 2022 European Martial Arts Games
 2022 European Para Youth Games
 2022 European Police and Fire Games
 2022 European Youth Olympic Festival
 2022 World Transplant Games (Winter) Cancelled
 2022 FICEP-FISEC Games
 2022 FISU America Games
 2022 Gratitude Games
 2022 World Air Games
 2022 world wind Games
 2022 Senior Olympics
 2022 Huntsman World Senior Games
 2022 Défi sportif
 2022 World Roller Games
 2022 World Martial Arts Games
 2022 International Army Games
 2022 Special Olympics European Games
 2022 Special Olympics MENA Games
 2022 European Universities Games
 2022 Americas Masters Games – Rio de Janeiro  TBD
 2022 African Youth Games – 
 2022 U18 World School Summer Games – 14–22 May

Air sports
 April 6 – 9, 2022: 2022 World Cup of Indoor Skydiving in  Charleroi
 April 20 – 30: 2022 FAI World Paramotor Championships in  Saquarema
 PF1 Subclass:   Pasquale Biondo,   Cyril Planton,   Jean-Emile Oulha
 PL1 Subclass:   Boris Tysebaert,   Michael Merle,   Marcelo Martins
 PL2 Subclass:   Fabrice Breuzard,   Stephane Clavurier,   Valcir Aires
 June 4 – 11: 2022 FAI World Intermediate Aerobatic Championship in  Toruń
   Maciej Kulaszewski,   Petre-Florin Glontaru,   Balázs Kiss
 June 20 – 30: 2022 CISM World Military Parachuting Championship in  Güssing
 July 2 – 16: 2022 FAI World 13,5 m Class Gliding Championship in  Pociūnai
   Nick Hanenburg,   Darius Gudžiūnas,   Linas Miežlaiškis
 July 8 – 14: 2022 FAI F3DE World Championships for Pylon Racing Model Aircraft in  Muncie
 F3D Class:   Emil Broberg,   Gino Del Ponte,   Gunnar Broberg
 F3E Class:   Tomáš Ciniburk,   Jan Sedláček,   Tyler Mees
 July 18 – 23: 2022 FAI World Freefall Style and Accuracy Landing Championships in  Strakonice
 July 23 – 30: 2022 FAI F4 World Championships for Scale Model Aircraft in  Tønsberg
 July 23 – 30: 2022 FAI World Microlight Championships in  Hosín
 July 23 – August 6: 2022 FAI World Gliding Championships in  Matkópuszta
 August 4 – 13: 2022 FAI World Aerobatic Championships in  Leszno
 August 13 – 27: 2022 FAI Women's World Gliding Championships in  Husbands Bosworth
 August 17 – 27: 2022 FAI World Glider Aerobatic Championships and 2022 FAI World Advanced Glider Aerobatic Championships in  Issoudun
 August 20 – 27: 2022 FAI F3J World Championship for Model Gliders in  Tekovský Hrádok
 August 20 – 27: 2022 FAI World Precision Flight Championship in  Albi
 September 10 – 17: 2022 FAI World Paramotor Slalom Championships in  Strachotín
 October 2 – 8: 2022 FAI F3F World Championship for Model Gliders in  Hanstholm
 October 9 – 14: 2022 FAI World Canopy Piloting Championships and 2022 FAI World Canopy Piloting Freestyle Championships in  Eloy
 October 20 – 26: 2022 FAI World Formation Skydiving Championships, 2022 FAI World Canopy Formation Championships, 2022 FAI World Artistic Events Championships, 2022 FAI World Speed Skydiving Championships and 2022 FAI World Wingsuit Flight Championships in  Eloy
 November 13 – 19: 2022 FAI World Rally Flying Championship in  Brits

Alpine skiing

American football

2022 IFAF Women's World Championship 
 July 28 – August 8: in

National Football League
 February 6: 2022 Pro Bowl in  Allegiant Stadium
 American Football Conference defeated National Football Conference, 41–35.
 February 13: Super Bowl LVI in  SoFi Stadium
  Los Angeles Rams defeated  Cincinnati Bengals, 23–20, to win their second Super Bowl.
 April 28 – 30: 2022 NFL Draft in  Las Vegas
 September 8 – January 8, 2023: 2022 NFL season

United States Football League
 April 16 – June 25: 2022 USFL season
 July 3: 2022 USFL Championship Game in  Canton - Birmingham Stallions defeated Philadelphia Stars, 33–30.

Indoor American football
 March 12 – July 30: 2022 IFL season
 August 13: IFL National Championship in  Henderson - Northern Arizona Wranglers defeated the Quad City Steamwheelers, 47–45
 March 12 – June 18: 2022 CIF season
 June 25: Champions Bowl VII in  Salina – Salina Liberty defeated the Omaha Beef, 38–34
 April 23 – July 30: 2022 NAL season
 August 13: NAL Championship in  Albany - Albany Empire defeated the Carolina Cobras, 47-20

College Football Playoff and National Championship Game
 December 31, 2021: Cotton Bowl Classic in  Arlington (Playoff Semifinal Game)
  Alabama Crimson Tide def.  Cincinnati Bearcats, 27–6.
 December 31, 2021: Orange Bowl in  Miami Gardens(Playoff Semifinal Game)
  Georgia Bulldogs def.  Michigan Wolverines, 34–11.
 January 10: College Football Playoff National Championship in  Indianapolis (Cotton Bowl Winner vs. Orange Bowl Winner)
  Georgia Bulldogs def.  Alabama Crimson Tide, 33–18

2021–22 NCAA football bowl games
 December 17, 2021: Bahamas Bowl in  Nassau
  Middle Tennessee Blue Raiders def.  Toledo Rockets, 31–24.
 December 17, 2021: Cure Bowl in  Orlando
  Coastal Carolina Chanticleers def.  Northern Illinois Huskies, 47–41.
 December 18, 2021: Boca Raton Bowl in  Boca Raton
  Western Kentucky Hilltoppers def.  Appalachian State Mountaineers, 59–38.
 December 18, 2021: New Mexico Bowl in  Albuquerque
  Fresno State Bulldogs def.  UTEP Miners, 31–24.
 December 18, 2021: Independence Bowl in  Shreveport
  UAB Blazers def.  BYU Cougars, 31–28.
 December 18, 2021: LendingTree Bowl in  Alabama
  Liberty Flames def.  Eastern Michigan Eagles, 56–20.
 December 18, 2021: LA Bowl in  Inglewood
  Utah State Aggies def.  Oregon State Beavers, 24–13.
 December 18, 2021: New Orleans Bowl in  New Orleans
  Louisiana Ragin' Cajuns def.  Marshall Thundering Herd, 36–21.
 December 20, 2021: Myrtle Beach Bowl in  Conway
  Tulsa Golden Hurricane def.  Old Dominion Monarchs, 30–17.
 December 21, 2021: Famous Idaho Potato Bowl in  Boise
  Wyoming Cowboys def.  Kent State Golden Flashes, 52–38.
 December 21, 2021: Frisco Bowl in  Frisco
  San Diego State Aztecs def.  UTSA Roadrunners, 38–24.
 December 22, 2021: Armed Forces Bowl in  Fort Worth
  Army Black Knights def.  Missouri Tigers, 24–22.
 December 23, 2021: Frisco Football Classic in  Frisco
  Miami RedHawks def.  North Texas Mean Green, 27–14.
 December 23, 2021: Gasparilla Bowl in  Tampa
  UCF Knights def.  Florida Gators, 29–17.
 December 24, 2021: Hawaii Bowl in  Honolulu
 Canceled
 December 25, 2021: Camellia Bowl in  Montgomery
  Georgia State Panthers def.  Ball State Cardinals, 51–20.
 December 27, 2021: Quick Lane Bowl in  Detroit
  Western Michigan Broncos def.  Nevada Wolf Pack, 52–24.
 December 27, 2021: Military Bowl in  Annapolis
 Canceled
 December 28, 2021: Birmingham Bowl in  Birmingham
  Houston Cougars def.  Auburn Tigers, 17–13.
 December 28, 2021: First Responder Bowl in  University Park
  Air Force Falcons def.  Louisville Cardinals, 31–28.
 December 28, 2021: Liberty Bowl in  Memphis
  Texas Tech Red Raiders def.  Mississippi State Bulldogs, 34–7.
 December 28, 2021: Holiday Bowl in  San Diego
 Canceled
 December 28, 2021: Guaranteed Rate Bowl in  Phoenix
  Minnesota Golden Gophers def.  West Virginia Mountaineers, 18–6.
 December 29, 2021: Fenway Bowl in  Boston
 Canceled
 December 29, 2021: Pinstripe Bowl in  The Bronx
  Maryland Terrapins def.  Virginia Tech Hokies, 54–10.
 December 29, 2021: Cheez-It Bowl in  Orlando
  Clemson Tigers def.  Iowa State Cyclones, 20–13.
 December 29, 2021: Alamo Bowl in  San Antonio
  Oklahoma Sooners def.  Oregon Ducks, 47–32.
 December 30, 2021: Peach Bowl in  Atlanta
  Michigan State Spartans def.  Pittsburgh Panthers, 31–21.
 December 30, 2021: Duke's Mayo Bowl in  Charlotte
  South Carolina Gamecocks def.  North Carolina Tar Heels, 38–21.
 December 30, 2021: Music City Bowl in  Nashville
  Purdue Boilermakers def.  Tennessee Volunteers, 48–45.
 December 30, 2021: Las Vegas Bowl in  Paradise
  Wisconsin Badgers def.  Arizona State Sun Devils, 20–13.
 December 31, 2021: Gator Bowl in  Jacksonville
  Wake Forest Demon Deacons def.  Rutgers Scarlet Knights, 38–10.
 December 31, 2021: Sun Bowl in  El Paso
  Central Michigan Chippewas def.  Washington State Cougars, 24–21.
 December 31, 2021: Arizona Bowl in  Tucson
 Canceled
 January 1: Fiesta Bowl in  Glendale
  Oklahoma State Cowboys def.  Notre Dame Fighting Irish, 37–35.
 January 1: Rose Bowl in  Pasadena
  Ohio State Buckeyes def.  Utah Utes, 48–45.
 January 1: Sugar Bowl in  New Orleans
  Baylor Bears vs.  Ole Miss Rebels, 21–7.
 January 1: Outback Bowl in  Tampa
  Arkansas Razorbacks def.  Penn State Nittany Lions, 24–10.
 January 1: Citrus Bowl in  Orlando
  Kentucky Wildcats def.  Iowa Hawkeyes, 20–17.
 January 4: Texas Bowl in  Houston
  Kansas State Wildcats def.  LSU Tigers, 42–20

Aquatics

FINA

World Championships

2022 World Aquatics Championships 
 June 18 – July 3: in  Budapest

Youth and Junior Championships 
August 10 – 13: 2022 FINA World Youth Artistic Swimming Championships in  Charlotte
August 23 – 27: 2022 FINA World Junior Artistic Swimming Championships in  Quebec City
 August 30 – September 4: 2022 FINA World Junior Swimming Championships in  Lima
 September 1 – 4: 2022 FINA World Junior Open Water Swimming Championships in  Mahé

Other discipline championships 
 December 17 – 22: 2022 FINA World Swimming Championships (25 m) in  Melbourne
 Moved from  Kazan due to Russo-Ukrainian War

2022 FINA Diving World Series
 April 8 – 10: 2nd Leg in  Kazan
 Cancelled due to Russo-Ukrainian War
 May 13 – 15: 1st Leg in  Montreal
 TBD: 3rd Leg in  Wuhan
 TBD: 4th Leg in  Zhuhai

2022 FINA Artistic Swimming World Series
 Women's Solo Technical winner:  Varvara Subbotina
 Women's Solo Free winner:  Eve Planeix
 Women's Duet Technical winners:  Varvara Subbotina & Svetlana Kolesnichenko
 Women's Duet Free winners:  Megumi Field, Natalia Vega & Anita Alvarez (reserve).
 Women's Team Technical winners: 
 Women's Team Free winners: 
 Men's Solo Technical winner:  Aleksandr Maltsev
 Men's Solo Free winner:  Javier Ruisanchez
 Mixed Duet Technical winners:  Aleksandr Maltsev, Mayya Gurbanberdieva & Olesia Platonova (reserve).
 Mixed Duet Free winners:  Aleksandr Maltsev, Olesia Platonova & Mayya Gurbanberdieva (reserve).
 Mixed Team Highlight winners: 
 April 1 – 3: 2nd Leg in  Paris
 Women's Solo Technical winner:  Oriane Jaillardon
 Women's Solo Free winner:  Iris Tió
 Women's Duet Technical winners:  Oriane Jaillardon, Romane Lunel & Sasha Comte (reserve)
 Women's Duet Free winners:  Megumi Field, Natalia Vega & Daniella Ramirez (reserve).
 Women's Team Highlight winners: 
 Women's Team Free Combination winners: 
 Women's Team Technical winners: 
 Women's Team Free winners: 
 Men's Solo Technical winner:  Fernando Díaz del Río
 Men's Solo Free winner:  Gustavo Sánchez
 Mixed Duet Technical winners:  Emma García & Pau Ribes
 Mixed Duet Free winners:  Emma García & Pau Ribes
 April 8 – 10: 3rd Leg in  Kazan
 Cancelled due to Russo-Ukrainian War
 Women's Solo Technical winner:  Vasiliki Alexandri
 Women's Solo Free winner:  Audrey Lamothe
 Women's Duet Technical winners:  Anna-Maria Alexandri & Eirini-Marina Alexandri
 Women's Duet Free winners:  Megumi Field & Natalia Vega
 Women's Team Technical winners: 
 Women's Team Free winners: 
 Men's Solo Technical winner:  Fernando Díaz del Río
 Men's Solo Free winner:  Gustavo Sánchez
 Mixed Duet Technical winners:  Yotaro Sato & Tomoka Sato
 Mixed Duet Free winners:  Yotaro Sato & Tomoka Sato
 Mixed Team Highlight winners: 
 Mixed Team Free Combination winners: 
 May 20 – 22: Super Final in  Athens
 Women's Solo Technical winner:  Vasiliki Alexandri
 Women's Solo Free winner:  Vasiliki Alexandri
 Women's Duet Technical winners:  Anna-Maria Alexandri, Eirini-Marina Alexandri & Vasiliki Alexandri (reserve)
 Women's Duet Free winners:  Anna-Maria Alexandri, Eirini-Marina Alexandri & Vasiliki Alexandri (reserve)
 Women's Team Technical winners: 
 Women's Team Free winners: 
 Men's Solo Technical winner:  Fernando Díaz del Río
 Men's Solo Free winner:  Fernando Díaz del Río
 Mixed Duet Technical winners:  Emma García & Pau Ribes
 Mixed Duet Free winners:  Emma García & Pau Ribes
 Mixed Team Highlight winners: 
 Mixed Team Free Combination winners:

2022 FINA Marathon Swim World Series

 May 28 & 29: 1st Leg in  Setúbal
 July 9 & 10: 2nd Leg in  Paris
 August 26 – 28: 3rd Leg in  Lac-Mégantic
 October 7 – 9: 4th Leg in  Fajardo
 November 11 & 12: 5th Leg in  Eilat

Non-FINA Events

2022 Red Bull Cliff Diving

 June 4: 1st stop in  Boston
 June 18: 2nd stop in  Paris
 July 16: 3rd stop in  Copenhagen
 August 13: 4th stop in  Oslo
 August 27: 5th stop in  Mostar
 September 11: 6th stop in  Sisikon
 September 25: 7th stop in  Polignano A Mare

2022 European Aquatics Championship

 August 11 – 21: in  Rome

Archery

World and Continental Championships
 February 14 – 19: 2022 Archery European Indoor Championships in  Laško
 Barebow winners:  Leo Pettersson (m) /  Cinzia Noziglia (f)
 Compound winners:  Mike Schloesser (m) /  Ella Gibson (f)
 Recurve winners:  Clément Jacquey (m) /  Lisa Barbelin (f)
 Barebow U21 winners:  Davide Morra (m) /  Elena Topliceanu (f)
 Compound U21 winners:  Mathias Fullerton (m) /  Arina Cherkezova (f)
 Recurve U21 winners:  Alexander Kryvoruchko (m) /  Dzvenyslava Chernyk (f)
 Barebow Team winners:  (Viggo Axelsson, Joakim Hassila, Leo Pettersson) (m) /  (Cinzia Noziglia, Fabia Rovatti, Laura Turello) (f)
 Compound Team winners:  (Sil Pater, Mike Schloesser, Max Verwoerdt) (m) /  (Viktoria Balzhanova, Elizaveta Knyazeva, Alexandra Savenkova) (f)
 Recurve Team winners:  (Thomas Chirault, Clément Jacquey, Jean-Charles Valladont) (m) /  (Veronika Marchenko, Anastasia Pavlova, Polina Rodionova) (f)
 Compound U21 Team winners:  (Christoffer Berg, Tore Bjarnarson, Mathias Fullerton) (m) /  (Hazal Burun, Songül Lök, İpek Tomruk) (f)
 Recurve U21 Team winners: Russian Archery Federation (Mukhibullo Makhmudov, Bair Torgubaev, Sergey Tsyrenov) (m) /  (Dzvenyslava Chernyk, Daria Koval, Zhanna Naumova) (f)
 February 19 – 27: 2022 World Para Archery Championship in  Dubai
 Recurve open winners:  Tomohiro Ueyama (m) /  Vincenza Petrilli (f)
 Compound open winners:  Matt Stutzman (m) / Tatiana Andrievskaia  (f)
 W1 winners:  Yigit Aydin (m) /  Lisa Coryell (f)
 Visual impaired 1 winner:  Ruben Vanhollebeke (x)
 Recurve open tem winners:  (m) /  (f & x) 
 Compound open team winners:  (m) /  (f) / Russian Archery Federation (x)
 W1 team winners:  (f) /   (f) / Russian Archery Federation (x)
 March 14–20: Puerto Rico Cup 2022 – Central American and Caribbean Games Qualifier in  Bayamón
 Recurve individual winners:  Adrián Muñóz (m) /  Alejandra Valencia (f)
 Compound individual winners:  Rodrigo Olvera (m) /  Dafne Quintero (f)
 Recurve team winners:  (m) /  (f) /  (x)
 Compound team winners:  (m) /  (f) /  (x)
 May 3 – 8: 2022 European Grand Prix in  Plovdiv
 June 6 – 12: 2022 European Archery Championships in  Munich
 September 4 – 10: 2022 World Archery 3D Championship in  Terni
 September 19 – 25 : 2022 Asian Games in  Hangzhou
 October 3 – 9: 2022 World Archery Field Championships in  Yankton
 October 8 – 15 : 2022 Asian Para Games in  Hangzhou

2022 Archery World Cup
 April 18 – 24: WC #1 in  Antalya
 Recurve individual winners:  Miguel Alvariño (m) /  Bryony Pitman (f)
 Recurve team winners:  (m) /  (f) /  (mixed)
 Compound individual winners:  Mike Schloesser (m) /  Ella Gibson (f)
 Compound team winners:  (m) /  (f) /  (mixed)
 May 16 – 22: WC #2 in  Gwangju
 Recurve individual winners:  Kim Woo-jin (m) /  Choi Mi-sun (f)
 Recurve team winners:  (m) /  (f) /  (mixed)
 Compound individual winners:  Mike Schloesser (m) /  Kim Yun-hee (f)
 Compound team winners:  (m) /  (f) /  (mixed)
 June 20 – 26: WC #3 in  Paris
 Recurve individual winners:  Marcus Vinicius D'Almeida (m) /  Agu Utano (f)
 Recurve team winners:  (m) /  (f) /  (mixed)
 Compound individual winners:  Nicolas Girard (m) /  Ella Gibson (f)
 Compound team winners:  (m) /  (f) /  (mixed)
 July 18 – 24: WC #4 in  Medellín
 Recurve individual winners:  Kim Woo-jin (m) /  Choi Mi-sun (f)
 Recurve team winners:  (m) /  (f) /  (mixed)
 Compound individual winners:  James Lutz (m) /  Ella Gibson (f)
 Compound team winners:  (m) /  (f) /  (mixed)
 October 15 – 16: WC Finals in  Tlaxcala

2022 Indoor Archery World Series
 January 21 – 23: Nîmes Archery Tournament in  Nîmes
 Recurve winners:  Felix Wieser (m) /  Lisa Barbelin (f)
 Compound winners:  Jean-Philippe Boulch (m) /  Sarah Prieels (f)
 Barebow winners:  Henri Dedieu (m) /  Maria Olesen (f)
 February 4 – 6: Vegas Shoot in  Las Vegas
 Recurve winners:  Brady Ellison (m) /  Casey Kaufhold (f)
 Compound winners:  Bodie Turner (m) /  Liko Arreola (f)
 Men's Barebow winner:  Richard Stark
 February 5: Indoor Archery World Series Finals in  Las Vegas (final)
 Recurve winners:  Felix Wieser (m) /  Penny Healey (f)
 Compound winners:  Nicolas Girard (m) /  Toja Ellison (f)

2022 Asia Cup
 March 13–19: Stage #1 in  Bangkok

2021 Summer World University Games 

 June 26 – July 7: in  Chengdu

2022 World Games 

 July 7 – 17: in  Birmingham

Association football

FIFA
November 20 – December 18: 2022 FIFA World Cup in 
August 10 – 28: 2022 FIFA U-20 Women's World Cup in 
October 11 – 30: 2022 FIFA U-17 Women's World Cup in 
Club competitions
February 3 – 12: 2021 FIFA Club World Cup in

AFC
January 20 – February 6: 2022 AFC Women's Asian Cup in 
June 1 – 19: 2022 AFC U-23 Asian Cup in 
Club competitions
March 8 – February 26, 2023: 2022 AFC Champions League
April 5 – October 22: 2022 AFC Cup

CAF
January 9 – February 6: 2021 Africa Cup of Nations in 
July 2 – 23: 2022 Africa Women Cup of Nations in 
Club competitions
September 10, 2021 – May 29: 2021–22 CAF Champions League
September 10, 2021 – May: 2021–22 CAF Confederation Cup

CONCACAF
February 25 – March 12 2022 CONCACAF Women's U-20 Championship in 
  defeats , 2–0.  took 3rd place against , 2–0.
April 23 – May 8 2022 CONCACAF Women's U-17 Championship in 
June 18 – July 3 2022 CONCACAF U-20 Championship in 
July 4 – 20: 2022 CONCACAF W Championship in 
Club competitions
February 15 – May 5: 2022 CONCACAF Champions League
TBD: 2022 CONCACAF League

CONMEBOL
July 8 – 30: 2022 Copa América Femenina in 
Club competitions
February 8 – October 29: 2022 Copa Libertadores (final in  Guayaquil)
March 8 – October 1: 2022 Copa Sudamericana (final in  Brasilia)
February 23: 2022 Recopa Sudamericana in  Curitiba
October 13 – 28: 2022 Copa Libertadores Femenina in 
February 5 – 20: 2022 U-20 Copa Libertadores in

OFC
July 5 – 31: 2022 OFC Women's Nations Cup
April: 2022 OFC U-20 Women's Championship
Club competitions
TBD: 2022 OFC Champions League

UEFA
July 6 – 31: UEFA Women's Euro 2022 in 
July 20 – August 2: 2022 UEFA European Under-19 Championship in 
June 26 – July 9: 2022 UEFA Women's Under-19 Championship in 
May 16 – June 1: 2022 UEFA European Under-17 Championship in 
May 3 – 15: 2022 UEFA Women's Under-17 Championship in 
In the final,  def. , 2–2, 3–2 on penalties.
Club competitions
June 22, 2021 – May 28: 2021–22 UEFA Champions League (final in  Paris)
In the final,  Real Madrid def.  Liverpool, 1–0.
August 3, 2021 – May 18: 2021–22 UEFA Europa League (final in  Seville)
In the final,  Eintracht Frankfurt def.  Rangers, 1–1, 5–4 on penalties.
July 6, 2021 – May 25: 2021–22 UEFA Europa Conference League (final in  Tirana)
In the final,  Roma def.  Feyenoord, 1–0.
August 17, 2021 – May 21: 2021–22 UEFA Women's Champions League (final in  Turin)
In the final,  Lyon def.  Barcelona, 3–1.
September 14, 2021 – April 25: 2021–22 UEFA Youth League (final in  Nyon)
In the final,  Benfica def.  Red Bull Salzburg, 6–0.
August 10: 2022 UEFA Super Cup in  Helsinki

Athletics

Badminton

Grade 1

2022 Thomas & Uber Cup
 May 8 – 15: in  Nonthaburi
 Thomas Cup:  def. , 3–0.
 Uber Cup:  def. , 3–2.

2022 BWF World Championships
 August 21 – 28: in  Tokyo

Continental Championships
 February 11–13: Oceania Junior Mixed Team Championships 2022 in  Auckland
 Cancelled
 February 14–17: Oceania Junior Championships 2022 in  Auckland
 Cancelled
 February 14–17: 2022 All Africa Men's and Women's Team Badminton Championships in  Kampala
 Men's Team:   def. , 3–0.
 Women's Team:   def. , 3–1.
 February 15–20: 2022 European Men's and Women's Team Badminton Championships in  Lahti
 Cancelled
 February 15–20: 2022 Badminton Asia Team Championships in  Shah Alam
 Men's Team:   def. , 3–0.
 Women's Team:   def. , 3–1.
 February 17–20: 2022 Pan Am M&F Cup in  Acapulco
 Men's Team:   def. , 3–2.
 Women's Team:   def. , 3–0.
 February 18–20: 2022 Oceania Badminton Championships in  Auckland
 Cancelled

Grade 2

2022 BWF World Tour 

BWF World Tour Finals 
December 14 – 16: in  Guangzhou

Super 1000
 March 16 – 20: 2022 All England Open in  Birmingham
 Men's singles:  Viktor Axelsen def.  Lakshya Sen, 21–10, 21–15.  
 Women's singles:  Akane Yamaguchi def.  An Se-young, 21–15, 21–15. 
 Men's doubles:  Muhammad Shohibul Fikri &  Bagas Maulana def.  Mohammad Ahsan &  Hendra Setiawan, 21–19, 21–13.
 Women's doubles:  Nami Matsuyama &  Chiharu Shida def.  Zhang Shuxian &  Zheng Yu, 21–13, 21–9.
 Mixed doubles:  Yuta Watanabe &  Arisa Higashino def.  Wang Yilyu &  Huang Dongping, 21–19, 21–19.
 June 14 – 19:  Indonesia Open in  Jakarta
 November 29 – December 4:  China Open in  Guangzhou

Super 750
 June 28 – August 3: 2022 Malaysia Open in  TBD
 August 30 – September 4: 2022 Japan Open in  Osaka
 October 18 – 23: 2022 Denmark Open in  Odense
 October 25 – 30: 2022 French Open in  Paris
 December 6 – 11: 2022 Fuzhou China Open in  Fuzhou

Super 500
 January 11–16: 2022 India Open in  New Delhi
 Men's singles:  Lakshya Sen def.  Loh Kean Yew, 24–22, 21–17.
 Women's singles:  Busanan Ongbamrungphan def.  Supanida Katethong, 22–20, 19–21, 21–13.
 Men's doubles:  Satwiksairaj Rankireddy &  Chirag Shetty def.  Mohammad Ahsan &  Hendra Setiawan, 21–16, 26–24.
 Women's doubles:  Benyapa Aimsaard &  Nuntakarn Aimsaard def.  Anastasiia Akchurina &  Olga Morozova, 21–13, 21–5.
 Mixed doubles:  Terry Hee &  Tan Wei Han def.  Chen Tang Jie &  Peck Yen Wei, 21–15, 21–18.
 April 5–10: 2022 Korea Open in  Suncheon
 Men's singles:  Weng Hongyang def.  Jonatan Christie, 12–21, 21–19, 21–15.
 Women's singles:  An Se-young def.  Pornpawee Chochuwong, 21–17, 21–18.
 Men's doubles:  Kang Min-hyuk &  Seo Seung-jae def.  Fajar Alfian &  Muhammad Rian Ardianto, 19–21, 21–15, 21–18.
 Women's doubles:  Jeong Na-eun &  Kim Hye-jeong def.  Benyapa Aimsaard &  Nuntakarn Aimsaard, 21–16, 21–12.
 Mixed doubles:  Tan Kian Meng &  Lai Pei Jing def.  Ko Sung-hyun &  Eom Hye-won, 21–15, 21–18.
 May 17–22: 2022 Thailand Open in  Bangkok
 Men's singles: 
 Women's singles: 
 Men's doubles: 
 Women's doubles: 
 Mixed doubles: 

Super 300
 January 17–23: 2022 Syed Modi International in  Lucknow
 Men's singles: Not awarded
 Women's singles:  P. V. Sindhu def.  Malvika Bansod, 21–13, 21–16.
 Men's doubles:  Man Wei Chong &  Tee Kai Wun def.  Krishna Prasad Garaga &  Vishnuvardhan Goud Panjala, 21–18, 21–15.
 Women's doubles:  Anna Cheong &  Teoh Mei Xing def.  Gayathri Gopichand &  Treesa Jolly, 21–12, 21–13.
 Mixed doubles:  Ishaan Bhatnagar &  Tanisha Crasto def.  T. Hema Nagendra Babu &  Srivedya Gurazada, 21–16, 21–12.
 March 1–6: 2022 Spain Masters in  Huelva
 Cancelled
 March 8–13: 2022 German Open in  Mülheim
 Men's singles:  Kunlavut Vitidsarn def.  Lakshya Sen, 21–18, 21–15.
 Women's singles:  He Bingjiao def.  Chen Yufei, 21–14, 27–25.
 Men's doubles:  Goh Sze Fei &  Nur Izzuddin def.  Liu Yuchen &  Ou Xuanyi, 23–21, 16–21, 21–14.
 Women's doubles:    Chen Qingchen &  Jia Yifan def.  Gabriela Stoeva &  Stefani Stoeva, 21–16, 29–30, 21–19.
 Mixed doubles:  Dechapol Puavaranukroh &  Sapsiree Taerattanachai def.  Ou Xuanyi &  Huang Yaqiong, 21–11, 21–9.
 March 22 – 27: 2022 Swiss Open in  Basel
 Men's singles:  Jonatan Christie def.  Prannoy H. S., 21–12, 21–18. 
 Women's singles:  P. V. Sindhu def.  Busanan Ongbamrungphan, 21–16, 21–8. 
 Men's doubles:  Fajar Alfian &  Muhammad Rian Ardianto def.  Goh Sze Fei &  Nur Izzuddin, 21–18, 21–19. 
 Women's doubles:  Gabriela Stoeva &  Stefani Stoeva def.  Linda Efler &  Isabel Lohau, 21–14, 21–12.
 Mixed doubles:  Mark Lamsfuß &  Isabel Lohau def.  Goh Soon Huat &  Shevon Jemie Lai, 12–21, 21–18, 21–17.
 April 12–17: 2022 Korea Masters in  Gwangju
 Men's singles:  Jeon Hyeok-jin def.  Kodai Naraoka, 21–17, 21–16.
 Women's singles:  He Bingjiao def.  Chen Yufei, 21–14, 14–21, 21–9.
 Men's doubles:  Kim Gi-jung &  Kim Sa-rang def.  Liu Yuchen &  Ou Xuanyi, 21–14, 21–16.
 Women's doubles:  Kim So-yeong &  Kong Hee-yong def.  Baek Ha-na &  Lee Yu-rim, 21–17, 21–12.
 Mixed doubles:  Wang Yilyu &  Huang Dongping def.  Ou Xuanyi &  Huang Yaqiong, 21–17, 21–17.

Super 100
 January 25–30: 2022 Odisha Open in  Cuttack
 Men's singles:  Kiran George def.  Priyanshu Rajawat, 21–15, 14–21, 21–18.
 Women's singles:  Unnati Hooda def.  Smit Toshniwal, 21–18, 21–11.
 Men's doubles:  Nur Mohd Azriyn Ayub &  Lim Khim Wah def.  Ravikrishna Ps &  Sankar Prasad Udayakumar, 18–21, 21–14, 21–16.
 Women's doubles:  Gayathri Gopichand &  Treesa Jolly def.  Sanyogita Ghorpade &  Shruti Mishra, 21–12, 21–10.
 Mixed doubles:  Sachin Dias &  Thilini Hendahewa def.  Arjun M.R. &  Treesa Jolly, 21–16, 22–20.
 March 29 – April 3: 2022 Orléans Masters in  Orléans
 Men's singles:  Toma Junior Popov def.  Mithun Manjunath, 21–11, 21–19.
 Women's singles:  Putri Kusuma Wardani def.  Iris Wang, 7–21, 21–19, 21–18.
 Men's doubles:  Ruben Jille &  Ties van der Lecq def.  Junaidi Arif &  Muhammad Haikal, Walkover.
 Women's doubles:  Gabriela Stoeva &  Stefani Stoeva def.  Stine Küspert &  Emma Moszczyński, 21–15, 21–14.
 Mixed doubles:  Terry Hee &  Tan Wei Han def.  Rehan Naufal Kusharjanto &  Lisa Ayu Kusumawati, 21–12, 16–21, 21–13.

Grade 3

BWF International Challenge

 January 27–30: 2022 Ukraine Open in  Kyiv
 Men's singles:  Christo Popov def.  Ong Ken Yon, 21–14, 22–20.
 Women's singles:  Aliye Demirbağ def.  Wen Yu Zhang, 21–13, 21–16.
 Men's doubles:  Chia Wei Jie &  Low Hang Yee def.  Emil Lauritzen &  Mads Vestergaard, 19–21, 22–20, 23–21.
 Women's doubles:  Stine Küspert &  Emma Moszczyński def.  Mariia Stoliarenko &  Yelyzaveta Zharka, 21–18, 21–12.
 Mixed doubles:  Jones Ralfy Jansen &  Linda Efler def.  Jan Colin Völker &  Stine Küspert, 21–12, 21–11.
 February 7–11: 2022 Iran Fajr International Challenge in  Shiraz
 Men's singles:  Meiraba Luwang Maisnam def.  Danylo Bosniuk, 18–21, 21–13, 21–19.
 Women's singles:  Tasnim Mir def.  Yulia Yosephine Susanto, 21–11, 11–21, 21–7.
 Men's doubles:  Abiyyu Fauzan Majid &  Ferdian Mahardika Ranialdy def.  Amir Jabbari &  Mehran Shahbazi, 21–15, 21–12.
 Women's doubles:  Ekaterina Malkova &  Anastasiia Shapovalova def.  Hajar Kabiri &  Saghar Rafei, 21–3, 21–13.
 February 18–20: 2022 African Badminton Championships in  Kampala
 Men's singles:  Anuoluwapo Juwon Opeyori def.  Brian Kasirye, 21–14, 23–21.
 Women's singles:  Nour Ahmed Youssri def.  Doha Hany, 21–16, 21–16.
 Men's doubles:  Koceila Mammeri &  Youcef Sabri Medel def.  Adham Hatem Elgamal &  Ahmed Salah, 21–23, 21–19, 21–18.
 Women's doubles:  Lorna Bodha &  Kobita Dookhee def.  Amy Ackerman &  Deidre Laurens Jordaan, 21–18, 22–20.
 Mixed doubles:  Koceila Mammeri &  Tanina Mammeri def.  Jarred Elliott &  Amy Ackerman, 21–13, 21–14.
 February 24–27: 2022 Uganda International in  Kampala
 Men's singles:  Arnaud Merklé def.  Harshit Aggarwal, 21–15, 18–21, 21–16.
 Women's singles:  Talia Ng def.  Mansi Singh, 21–10, 21–12.
 Men's doubles:  Boon Xin Yuan &  Wong Tien Ci def.  Jones Ralfy Jansen &  Jan Colin Völker, 21–15, 21–14.
 Women's doubles:  Kasturi Radhakrishnan &  Venosha Radhakrishnan def.  Martina Corsini &  Judith Mair, 21–18, 21–19.
 Mixed doubles:  Koceila Mammeri &  Tanina Mammeri def.  Senthil Vel Govindarasu &  Venosha Radhakrishnan, 19–21, 21–18, 22–20.
 February 25–27: Italian Junior 2022 in  Milano
 Cancelled
 March 22–27: Vietnam International Challenge 2022 in  Hanoi
 Cancelled
 March 24–27: 2022 Polish Open in  Arłamów
 Men's singles:  Kiran George def.  Lee Chia-hao, 21–15, 21–14.
 Women's singles:  Anupama Upadhyaya def.  Aditi Bhatt, 17–21, 21–14, 21–17.
 Men's doubles:  Rasmus Kjær &  Frederik Søgaard def.  Su Ching-heng &  Ye Hong-wei, 21–16, 17–21, 21–19.
 Women's doubles:  Yeung Nga Ting &  Yeung Pui Lam def.  Lee Chia-hsin &  Teng Chun-hsun, 21–9, 21–18.
 Mixed doubles:  Ye Hong-wei &  Lee Chia-hsin def.  Paweł Śmiłowski &  Wiktoria Adamek, 22–20, 21–17.
 April 6–10: Osaka International Challenge 2022 in  Sakai
 Cancelled
 April 12–16: 2022 Mexican International Challenge in  Aguascalientes
 Men's singles:  Minoru Koga def.  Jonathan Matias, 10–21, 22–20, 21–13.
 Women's singles:  Riko Gunji def.  Natsuki Nidaira, 10–21, 22–20, 21–13.
 Men's doubles:  Shuntaro Mezaki &  Haruya Nishida def.  Jones Ralfy Jansen &  Jan Colin Völker, 21–15, 21–16.
 Women's doubles:  Rui Hirokami &  Yuna Kato def.  Ayako Sakuramoto &  Hinata Suzuki, 15–21, 21–19, 21–17.
 Mixed doubles:  Naoki Yamada &  Moe Ikeuchi def.  Vinson Chiu &  Jennie Gai, 21–15, 18–21, 21–10.

BWF International Series

 January 13–16: 2022 Estonian International in  Tallinn
 Men's singles:  Alex Lanier def.  Kok Jing Hong, 22–20, 21–15.
 Women's singles:  Kristin Kuuba def.  Thamonwan Nithiittikrai, 19–21, 23–21, 21–15.
 Men's doubles:  Ruttanapak Oupthong &  Sirawit Sothon def.  Danny Bawa Chrisnanta &  Andy Kwek, 21–17, 17–21, 21–16.
 Women's doubles:  Chasinee Korepap &  Jhenicha Sudjaipraparat def.  Viktoriia Kozyreva &  Mariia Sukhova, 21–14, 21–15.
 Mixed doubles:  Ratchapol Makkasasithorn &  Jhenicha Sudjaipraparat def.  Ruttanapak Oupthong &  Chasinee Korepap, 21–15, 21–14.
 January 18–23: 2022 Swedish Open in  Uppsala
 Men's singles:  Kok Jing Hong def.  Yeoh Seng Zoe, Walkover.
 Women's singles:  Pitchamon Opatniput def.  Pornpicha Choeikeewong, 16–21, 21–9, 21–16.
 Men's doubles:  Danny Bawa Chrisnanta &  Andy Kwek def.  Chia Wei Jie &  Low Hang Yee, 21–13, 23–21.
 Women's doubles:  Chasinee Korepap &  Jhenicha Sudjaipraparat def.  Johanna Magnusson &  Clara Nistad, 21–16, 23–21.
 Mixed doubles:  Anton Kaisti &  Alžběta Bášová def.  Kristian Kræmer &  Amalie Cecilie Kudsk, 21–19, 21–16.
 January 28–30: 2022 Swedish Junior Open in  Uppsala
 Cancelled
 February 2–06: 2022 Iran Junior International Series in  Shiraz
 Men's singles:  Sankar Subramanian def.  Ali Hayati, 21–17, 21–17.
 Women's singles:  Samayara Panwar def.  Ferdous Foroughi, 21–14, 21–15.
 Men's doubles:  Ali Hayati &  Mohammad Zarchi def.  Hajmalek Amirmohammad &  Amirhossein Hasani, 21–18, 21–16.
 Women's doubles:  Ferdous Foroughi &  Mobina Nedaei def.  Samayara Panwar &  Elen Tiraturyan, 21–15, 21–13.
 February 3–06: 2022 Malta Junior International in  Cospicua
 Cancelled
 February 10–13: 2022 Hungarian Junior International Championships in  Pécs
 Men's singles:  Sanjeevi Padmanabhan def.  Paul Tournefier, 21–19, 11–4 (ret).
 Women's singles:  Petra Maixnerová def.  Lucie Krulová, Walkover.
 Men's doubles:  Jarne Schlevoigt &  Nikolaj Stupplich def.  Igor Jovanovic &  Aleksandar Jovicic, Walkover.
 Women's doubles:  Selin Hübsch &  Julia Meyer def.  Adele Fillonneau &  Eulalie Serre, 22–20, 21–10.
 Mixed doubles:  Jarne Schlevoigt &  Julia Meyer def.  Jonathan Dresp &  Cara Siebrecht, 21–18, 25–23.
 March 10–13: 2022 Portugal International Championships in  Caldas da Rainha
 Men's singles:  Andi Fadel Muhammad def.  Karan Rajan Rajarajan, 21–11, 21–18.
 Women's singles:  Hsu Wen-chi def.  Yeung Sum Yee, 21–13, 21–17.
 Men's doubles:  Su Ching-heng &  Ye Hong-wei def.  Wei Chun-wei &  Wu Guan-xun, 21–13, 21–14.
 Women's doubles:  Yeung Nga Ting &  Yeung Pui Lam def.  Sharone Bauer &  Vimala Hériau, 21–14, 21–8.
 Mixed doubles:  Ye Hong-wei &  Lee Chia-hsin def.  Jan Colin Völker &  Stine Küspert, 21–10, 19–21, 21–9.
 March 18–20: 2022 Spanish Junior Open in  Oviedo
 Postponed
 March 24–26: Israel Junior 2022 in  Rishon LeZion
 Men's singles:  David Smutný def.  Daniel Dvořák, 21–13, 21–16.
 Women's singles:  Anwesha Gowda def.  Petra Maixnerová, 21–17, 21–8.
 Men's doubles:  Daniel Dvořák &  Jan Rázl def.  Mayan Mogilner &  Sharon Perelshtein, 21–10, 21–6.
 Women's doubles:  Elisaveta Berik &  Emili Pärsim def.  Stella Balenović &  Ana Pranić, 17–21, 21–11, 21–15.
 Mixed doubles:  Jan Rázl &  Petra Maixnerová def.  Rene Leeman &  Emilia Shapovalova, 21–7, 21–10.

BWF Future Series

 January 27–30: 2022 Iceland International in  Reykjavík
 Cancelled
 February 28 – March 2: Uganda Junior International 2022 in  Kampala
 Men's singles:  Khemtish Rai Nundah def.  Akbar Oduka, 21–15, 21–12.
 Women's singles:  Anupama Upadhyaya def.  Meghana Mareddy, 21–10, 12–21, 21–17.
 Men's doubles:  Jason Francois &  Khemtish Rai Nundah def.  Guna Kusal Dhulupudi &  Paul Makande, 21–18, 21–13.
 Women's doubles:  Fadilah Shamika Mohamed &  Tracy Naluwooza def.  Diya Chetan &  Brenda Namanya, 21–5, 21–3.
 Mixed doubles:  Paul Makande &  Fadilah Shamika Mohamed def.  Abed Bukenya &  Tracy Naluwooza, 21–15, 21–14.
 March 2–5: 2022 Slovak Open in  Trencin
 Men's singles:  Riku Hatano def.  Chi Yu-jen, 21–17, 21–15.
 Women's singles:  Aditi Bhatt def.  Hsu Wen-chi, 19–21, 21–10, 25–23.
 Men's doubles:  Boon Xin Yuan &  Wong Tien Ci def.  Law Cheuk Him &  Lee Chun Hei, 21–18, 14–21, 21–19.
 Women's doubles:  Lee Chia-hsin &  Teng Chun-hsun def.  Yeung Nga Ting &  Yeung Pui Lam, 21–16, 15–21, 22–20.
 Mixed doubles:  Yeung Ming Nok &  Yeung Pui Lam def.  Wiktor Trecki &  Magdalena Świerczyńska, 21–16, 21–12.
 March 16–20: Torneo Internacional Giraldilla 2022 in  Havana
 Postponed

Bandy
 January 21 – 23: 2022 Bandy World Championship Y21 in  Jyväskylä
 Cancelled due to the COVID-19 pandemic
 March 11 – 13: 2022 Girl's Bandy World Championship Y17 in  Lidköping
 March 23 – 27: 2022 Women's Bandy World Championship in  Åby
 Final placements: : , : , : 
 March 24 – 26: 2022 Bandy World Championship Y17 in  Kemerovo
 Cancelled due Russian invasion of Ukraine
 March 27 – April 3: 2020 Bandy World Championship in  Syktyvkar (since before postponed to 2022 due to the COVID-19 pandemic)
 Cancelled due Russian invasion of Ukraine
 April 1 – 3: 2022 Bandy World Championship Y19 in  Katrineholm

Baseball

 January 28 – February 3: 2022 Caribbean Series in  Santo Domingo
 In the final,  Caimanes de Barranquilla def.  Gigantes del Cibao, 4–1, to win their 1st title.
 September 9 – 18: 2022 U-18 Baseball World Cup in  Sarasota and Bradenton
 TBC: 2022 U-15 Baseball World Cup
 TBC: 2022 U-12 Baseball World Cup

Major League Baseball
March 31 – October 2: 2022 Major League Baseball season
July 12: 2022 Major League Baseball All-Star Game at Dodger Stadium in  Los Angeles, California
July 17-19: 2022 Major League Baseball draft
October 7 - November 5: 2022 MLB postseason:  Houston Astros defeat  Philadelphia Phillies 4-2 in 2022 World Series

2022 Little League Baseball  World Series
August 18 – 28: Little League World Series in  South Williamsport at both the Little League Volunteer Stadium and Howard J. Lamade Stadium

Basketball

 September 22 – October 1: 2022 FIBA Women's Basketball World Cup in

National Basketball Association
October 19, 2021 – April 10, 2022: 2021–22 NBA season
February 20: 2022 NBA All-Star Game at Rocket Mortgage FieldHouse in  Cleveland, Ohio
All-Star Game: Team LeBron defeats Team Durant 163 – 160.
Skills Challenge: Team Cavs (Jarrett Allen, Darius Garland, Evan Mobley) 
Three Point Contest: Karl-Anthony Towns 
Slam Dunk Contest: Obi Toppin 
April 16 – June 16 : 2022 NBA playoffs  Golden State Warriors defeated  Boston Celtics 4–2 in the 2022 NBA Finals
June 23: 2022 NBA draft

National Collegiate Athletic Association
March 15 – April 4: 2022 NCAA Division I men's basketball tournament
March 18 – April 3: 2022 NCAA Division I women's basketball tournament

FIBA Africa
 October 21, 2021 – May 28: 2022 BAL season

FIBA Americas
 September 2 – 11: 2022 FIBA AmeriCup in 
 December 10, 2021 – April: 2021–22 BCL Americas

FIBA Asia
 July 12 – 24: 2022 FIBA Asia Cup in 
 September 26 – October 1: 2022 FIBA Asia Champions Cup
 TBD for October: 2022–23 East Asia Super League

FIBA Europe
Men's
 September 30, 2021 – May 29: 2021–22 EuroLeague
 In the final,  Anadolu Efes def.  Real Madrid, 58–57.
 October 19, 2021 – May 11: 2021–22 EuroCup Basketball
 In the final,  Virtus Segafredo Bologna def.  Frutti Extra Bursaspor, 80–67.
 September 13, 2021 – May 8: 2021–22 Basketball Champions League
 In the final,  Lenovo Tenerife def.  Baxi Manresa, 98–87.
 September 28, 2021 – April 27: 2021–22 FIBA Europe Cup
 In the final,  Bahçeşehir Koleji def.  UNAHOTELS Reggio Emilia, 72–69, 90–74.

Women's
 September 21, 2021 – April 10: 2021–22 EuroLeague Women
 In the final,  Sopron Basket def.  Fenerbahçe, 60–55.
 September 23, 2021 – April 6: 2021–22 EuroCup Women
 In the final,  Tango Bourges Basket def.  Umana Reyer Venezia, 74–38.

Regional
Men's
 September 23, 2021 –: 2021–22 Alpe Adria Cup
 October 12, 2021 – May 1: 2021–22 BIBL season
 October 1, 2021 –: 2021–22 Latvian–Estonian Basketball League
 September 24, 2021 –: 2021–22 BNXT League
 September 24, 2021 –: 2021–22 ABA League First Division
 October 11, 2021 –: 2021–22 ABA League Second Division
Women's
 September 30, 2021 –: 2021–22 Baltic Women's Basketball League
 September 29, 2021 –: 2021–22 WABA League

Basque pelota
 October 23 – 30: 2022 Basque Pelota World Championships in  Biarritz

Beach handball

AHF
 March 20 – 29: 2022 Asian Beach Handball Championship in  Pattaya

EHF

2021–22 European Beach Handball Tour
 January 29 & 30: Winter Prague Open Beach Handball in  Prague
 Winners:  Piotrków Trybunalski (m) /  BHC Zagreb (f)
 May 26 – 29: Camelot Beach Tournament in  Tilburg
 June 2 – 5: AC Life StyleBeach Handball Erice in  Erice
 July 1 – 3: LBHX in 
 July 1 – 3: Damp Beach Open in  Damp
 July 14 & 15: Åhus Beachhandboll Festival in

Beach tennis

2022 ITF Beach Tennis World Tour

BT400
 February 17 – 19: BT400 #1 in  Balneário Rincão

BT200
 January 21 – 23: BT200 #1 in  Santos
 Winners:  André Baran &  Théo Irigaray (m) /  Giulia Gasparri &  Ninny Valentini
 January 28 – 30: BT200 #2 in  Campinas
 Winners:  Michele Cappelletti &  Antomi Ramos Viera (m) /  Patrícia Diaz &  Rafaella Miiller
 February 4 – 6: BT200 #3 in  Campinas
 Winners:  Daniel Schmitt &  João Wiesinger (m) /  Maraike Biglmaier &  Eva Fernández Palos
 February 11 – 13: BT200 #4 in  Matinhos

BT50
 January 8 & 9: BT50 #1 in  Puerto Morelos
 Winners:  Hiram Ramos &  Luis Miguel Reyes Peñalverty (m) /  Manuela Cunha &  Sophie Marie Schmidt
 January 14 – 16: BT50 #2 in  Guarapari
 Winners:  Hugo Russo &  Augusto Russo (m) /  Juliana Lima &  Bruna Macedo
 February 5 & 6: BT50 #3 in  Ránquil
 Cancelled

BT10
 January 7: BT10 #1 in  Puerto Morelos
 Winners:  Lucas Fabeiro &  Jorge Molina (m) /  Manuela Cunha &  Sophie Marie Schmidt
 January 13: BT10 #2 in  Guarapari
 Winners:  Raphael Borges &  Ronaldo Paiva (m) /  Lara Albani &  Brunella Paiva
 January 15: BT10 #3 in  Tampa
 Winners:  Jose Castillo &  Rafael Navas Crespo (m) /  Jessica Cortes &  Jessica Sucupira
 January 19: BT10 #4 in  Santos
 Winners:  Gustavo Garbarski &  Natã Porte (m) /  Roberta Argentino &  Julianna Martins
 January 27: BT10 #5 in  Campinas
 Winners:  Pedro Dellanegra &  Ricardo Strazzacappa Barone (m) /  Brenda Brissac &  Camila Gouveia de Barros
 January 28 – 30: BT10 #6 in  Oranjestad
 Winners:  Bertrand Coulet &  John Herrera (m) /  Maria Buuts &  Martine van Woudenberg
 January 29 & 30: BT10 #7 in  Viña del Mar
 Winners:  Braulio Cortés &  Pablo Rojas (m) /  Josefa Valdivia &  Javiera Veloso
 January 29: BT10 #8 in  #1
 Winners:  Estéban Bonnet &  Benjamin Gros (m) /  Kätlin Järveoja &  Eneli Pormeister
 January 30: BT10 #9 in  #2
 Winners:  Estéban Bonnet &  Benjamin Gros (m) /  Kätlin Järveoja &  Eneli Pormeister
 February 2 & 3: BT10 #10 in  Ránquil
 Cancelled
 February 3: BT10 #11 in  Campinas
 Winners:  Murilo Valadares &  Augusto Oliveira (m) /  Giovana Lourenço Trusz &  Isadora Lourenço Trusz
 February 9 & 10: BT10 #12 in  Cobquecura
 Cancelled
 February 10: BT10 #13 in  Matinhos
 Winners:  Anderson Mendonça da Silva &  Matheus Montibeller (m) /  Sophia Romanova &  Polina Soldatenkova
 February 18 – 20: BT10 #14 in  El Tabo
 Cancelled
 February 25 & 26: BT10 #15 in  Algarrobo #1
 Cancelled
 February 25 – 27: BT10 #16 in  Oranjestad
 February 27: BT10 #15 in  Algarrobo #2
 Cancelled

Beach volleyball

2022 Volleyball World Beach Pro Tour
Elite 16
Challenge

2022–22 South American Continental Cup
 March 30 & 31, 2021: Continental Cup #1 in  Santiago
 Men's winners:  André Stein & George Wanderley, Runner-up:  Julian Azaad & Nicolás Capogrosso
 Women's winners:  Norisbeth Agudo & Gabriela Brito, Runner-up:  Ana Gallay & Fernanda Pereyra
 January 7 – 9: Continental Cup #2 in  San Juan
 Men's winners:  Adrielson Silva & Arthur da Silva Mariano, Runner-up:  Nicolás Capogrosso & Tomás Capogrosso
 Women's winners:  Ana Gallay & Fernanda Pereyra, Runner-up:  Erika Mongelos & Giuliana Poletti
 January 14 – 16: Continental Cup #3 in  Montevideo
 Men's winners:  Hans Hannibal & Marco Cairús, Runner-up:  Noé Aravena & Vicente Droguett
 Women's winners:  Ângela Lavalle & Claudinere Bento Sabino, Runner-up:  María Francisca Rivas & Chris Vorpahl
 February 4 – 6: Continental Cup #4 in  Viña del Mar
 March 4 – 6: Continental Cup #5 in  Mollendo
 March 11 – 13: Continental Cup #6 in  Cochabamba 
 May 13 – 15: Continental Cup #7 in  Uberlândia (final)

Biathlon

Bobsleigh & Skeleton

 January 9: IBSF Skeleton Junior and U20 European Championships 2022 in  Altenberg
 Juniors winners:  Evgeniy Rukosuev (m) /  Agathe Bessard (f)
 U20 Skeleton winners:  Elvis Veinbergs (m) /  Polina Turina (f)
 January 14 – 16: IBSF European Championships 2022 in  St. Moritz
 2-man Bobsleigh winners:  Francesco Friedrich & Thorsten Margis
 2-woman Bobsleigh winners:  Kim Kalicki & Lisa Buckwitz
 4-man Bobsleigh winners:  (Oskars Ķibermanis, Edgars Nemme, Matīss Miknis, Dāvis Spriņģis)
 Women's Monobob winner:  Mariama Jamanka 
 Skeleton winners:  Martins Dukurs (m) /  Kimberley Bos (f)
 January 14 – 16: IBSF Junior and Youth European Championships 2022 in  Winterberg
 Juniors 2-man Bobsleigh winners:  Philipp Zielasko & Henrik Proske
 U23 2-man Bobsleigh winners:  Stepan Dubinko & Aleksei Kislitsa
 U23 2-woman Bobsleigh winners:  Georgeta Popescu & Antonia Sârbu
 Juniors 2-woman Bobsleigh winners:  Maureen Zimmer & Anabel Galander
 U23 4-man Bobsleigh winners:  (Stepan Dubinko, Nikita Ivanov, Ilia Ivanov, Aleksei Kislitsa)
 Junior 4-man Bobsleigh winners:  (Nico Semmler, Oliver Peschk, Rupert Schenk, Marvin Paul)
 Women's Monobob Youth winner:  Georgeta Popescu
 Women's Monobob Junior winner:  Georgeta Popescu
 January 21 – 23: IBSF Junior World Championships 2022 in  Innsbruck
 Juniors 2-man Bobsleigh winners:  Maximilian Illmann & Lukas Koller
 U23 2-man Bobsleigh winners:  Laurin Zern & Rupert Schenk
 U23 2-woman Bobsleigh winners:  Diana Filipszki & Lauryn Siebert
 Juniors 2-woman Bobsleigh winners:  Lubov Chernykh & Anastasia Kurysheva
 Junior 4-man Bobsleigh winners:  (Dāvis Kaufmanis, Lauris Kaufmanis, Arnis Bebrišs, Ivo Dans Kleinbergs)
 U23 4-man Bobsleigh winners:  (Stepan Dubinko, Nikita Ivanov, Egor Gryaznov, Aleksei Kislitsa)
 Women's Monobob Junior winner:  Maureen Zimmer
 Women's U23 monobob winner:  Viktória Čerňanská
 Junior Skeleton winners:  Evgeniy Rukosuev (m) /  Susanne Kreher (f)
 U20 Skeleton winners:  Lukas David Nydegger (m) /  Anastasiia Tsyganova (f)

2021–22 Bobsleigh World Cup
 November 19 – 21, 2021: WC #1 in  Innsbruck #1
 2-man Bobsleigh winners:  Francesco Friedrich & Alexander Schüller
 2-woman Bobsleigh winners:  Laura Nolte & Leonie Fiebig
 4-man Bobsleigh winners:  (Francesco Friedrich, Alexander Schüller, Thorsten Margis, Candy Bauer)
 November 26 – 28, 2021: WC #2 in  Innsbruck #2
 2-man Bobsleigh winners:  Francesco Friedrich & Thorsten Margis
 2-woman Bobsleigh winners:  Laura Nolte & Deborah Levi
 4-man Bobsleigh winners:  (Francesco Friedrich, Alexander Schüller, Thorsten Margis, Martin Grothkopp)
 December 3 – 5, 2021: WC #3 in  Altenberg #1
 2-man Bobsleigh winners:  Francesco Friedrich & Alexander Schüller
 2-woman Bobsleigh winners:  Kaillie Humphries & Kaysha Love
 4-man Bobsleigh winners:  (Francesco Friedrich, Alexander Schüller, Thorsten Margis, Candy Bauer)
 December 10 – 12, 2021: WC #4 in  Winterberg #1
 2-woman Bobsleigh winners:  Laura Nolte & Deborah Levi
 4-man Bobsleigh winners:  (Francesco Friedrich, Alexander Schüller, Thorsten Margis, Martin Grothkopp) (1st) /  (Francesco Friedrich, Alexander Schüller, Thorsten Margis, Candy Bauer) (2nd)
 December 17 – 19, 2021: WC #5 in  Altenberg #2
 2-man Bobsleigh winners:  Francesco Friedrich & Thorsten Margis
 2-woman Bobsleigh winners:  Kim Kalicki & Lisa Buckwitz
 4-man Bobsleigh winners:  (Francesco Friedrich, Thorsten Margis, Martin Grothkopp, Alexander Schüller)
 December 31, 2021 – January 2: WC #6 in  Sigulda
 2-man Bobsleigh winners:  Rostislav Gaitiukevich & Mikhail Mordasov (1st) /  Francesco Friedrich & Thorsten Margis (2nd)
 2-woman Bobsleigh winners:  Elana Meyers Taylor & Lake Kwaza
 January 7 – 9: WC #7 in  Winterberg #2
 2-man Bobsleigh winners:  Francesco Friedrich & Alexander Schüller
 2-woman Bobsleigh winners:  Laura Nolte & Deborah Levi
 4-man Bobsleigh winners:  (Francesco Friedrich, Alexander Schüller, Candy Bauer, Thorsten Margis)
 January 14 – 16: WC #8 in  St. Moritz
 2-man Bobsleigh winners:  Francesco Friedrich & Thorsten Margis
 2-woman Bobsleigh winners:  Kim Kalicki & Lisa Buckwitz
 4-man Bobsleigh winners:  (Oskars Ķibermanis, Dāvis Spriņģis, Matīss Miknis, Edgars Nemme)
 2-man Bobsleigh World Cup winner:  Francesco Friedrich
 4-man Bobsleigh World Cup winner:  Francesco Friedrich
 2-woman Bobsleigh World Cup winner:  Elana Meyers Taylor

2021–22 IBSF Women's Monobob World Series
 November 7–9, 2021: World Series #1 in  Whistler
 Winner:  Alysia Rissling (3 times)
 November 11 & 12, 2021: World Series #2 in  Lillehammer
 Winner:  Stephanie Schneider (2 times)
 November 20, 2021: World Series #3 in  Innsbruck
 Winner:  Elana Meyers Taylor
 November 23 & 24, 2021: World Series #4 in  Park City
 Winner:  Alysia Rissling (2 times)
 November 26, 2021: World Series #5 in  Altenberg
 Winner:  Lisa Buckwitz
 November 27, 2021: World Series #6 in  Innsbruck
 Winner:  Elana Meyers Taylor
 December 3, 2021: World Series #7 in  Winterberg
 Winner:  Breeana Walker
 December 4, 2021: World Series #8 in  Altenberg
 Winner:  Kaillie Humphries
 December 11, 2021: World Series #9 in  Sigulda
 Winner:  Kim Yoo-ran
 December 11, 2021: World Series #10 in  Winterberg
 Winner:  Elana Meyers Taylor
 December 13 – 15, 2021: World Series #11 in  Lake Placid
 Winner:  Alysia Rissling (3 times)
 December 18, 2021: World Series #12 in  Altenberg
 Winner:  Christine de Bruin
 January 1: World Series #13 in  Sigulda
 Winner:  Christine de Bruin
 January 6 & 7: World Series #14 in  Innsbruck
 Winners:  Stephanie Schneider (1st) /  Margot Boch (2nd)
 January 8: World Series #15 in  Winterberg
 Winner:  Elana Meyers Taylor
 January 14: World Series #16 in  Winterberg
 Winner:  Simidele Adeagbo
 January 15: World Series #17 in  St. Moritz
 Winner:  Kaillie Humphries
 World Cup winner:  Elana Meyers Taylor

2021–22 Skeleton World Cup
 November 19, 2021: WC #1 in  Innsbruck #1
 Men's winner:  Aleksandr Tretyakov
 Women's winner:  Elena Nikitina
 November 26, 2021: WC #2 in  Innsbruck #2
 Men's winners:  Geng Wenqiang,  Christopher Grotheer,  Matt Weston (same time)
 Women's winner:  Elena Nikitina
 December 3, 2021: WC #3 in  Altenberg #1
 Men's winner:   Axel Jungk
 Women's winner:  Tina Hermann
 December 10, 2021: WC #4 in  Winterberg #1
 Men's winner:  Aleksandr Tretyakov
 Women's winner:  Kimberley Bos
 December 17, 2021: WC #5 in  Altenberg #2
 Men's winner:  Martins Dukurs
 Women's winner:  Tina Hermann
 December 31, 2021: WC #6 in  Sigulda
 Men's winner:  Tomass Dukurs
 Women's winner:  Janine Flock
 January 7: WC #7 in  Winterberg #2
 Men's winner:  Martins Dukurs
 Women's winner:  Kimberley Bos
 January 14: WC #8 in  St. Moritz
 Men's winner:  Martins Dukurs
 Women's winner:  Jaclyn Narracott
 World Cup winners:  Martins Dukurs (m) /  Kimberley Bos (f)

2021–22 Para Sport World Cup
 November 22 & 23, 2021: Para Sport WC #1 in  Lake Placid
 Men's Para Bobsleigh winners:  Robert Balk (1st) /  Israel Blanco (2nd)
 December 5 & 6, 2021: Para Sport WC #2 in  Park City
 Here 1st Para Bobsleigh competition is cancelled.
 Men's Para Bobsleigh #2 winner:  Robert Balk

2021–22 IBSF Intercontinental Cup
 November 13 & 14, 2021: Intercontinental Cup #1 in  Whistler
 Men's Skeleton winner:  Evgeniy Rukosuev (2 times)
 Women's Skeleton winners:  Sophia Griebel (1st) /  Nicole Rocha Silveira (2nd)
 November 23 & 24, 2021: Intercontinental Cup #2 in  Park City
 Men's Skeleton winners:  Felix Keisinger (1st) /  Lukas Nydegger (2nd)
 Women's Skeleton winner:  Susanne Kreher (2 times)
 December 3 & 4, 2021: Intercontinental Cup #3 in  Innsbruck
 Men's Skeleton winners:  Zheng Yin 
 Women's Skeleton winner:  Zhao Dan
 December 13, 2021: Intercontinental Cup #4 in  Sigulda
 Winners:  Evgeniy Rukosuev (m) /  Susanne Kreher (f)
 January 5 & 6: Intercontinental Cup #5 in  Altenberg
 Men's Skeleton winners:  Evgeniy Rukosuev (1st) /  Felix Seibel (2nd)
 Women's Skeleton winner:  Susanne Kreher (2 times)

2021–22 IBSF Bobsleigh European Cup
 November 11–14, 2021: EC #1 in  Lillehammer
 2-man Bobsleigh winners:  Adam Dobeš / Dominik Záleský (1st) /  Richard Oelsner / Georg Fleischhauer (2nd)
 2-woman Bobsleigh winners:  Stephanie Schneider & Claudia Schüßler (1st) /  Lisa Buckwitz & Marijana Herrmann (2nd)
 4-man Bobsleigh winners:  (Aleksey Stulnev, Vladislav Zharovtsev, Dmitriy Zakhryapin, Kirill Antyukh) (2 times)
 November 26 & 27, 2021: EC #2 in  Altenberg
 2-man Bobsleigh winners:  Richard Oelsner & Georg Fleischhauer
 2-woman Bobsleigh winners:  Lisa Buckwitz & Vanessa Mark
 4-man Bobsleigh winners:  (Richard Oelsner, Bastian Heber, Henrik Bosse, Georg Fleischhauer)
 December 3–5, 2021: EC #3 in  Winterberg
 2-man Bobsleigh winners:  Maximilian Illmann & Philipp Wobeto
 2-woman Bobsleigh winners:  Stephanie Schneider & Theresa Leitz (2 times)
 4-man Bobsleigh winners:  (Aleksey Stulnev, Vladislav Zharovtsev, Dmitriy Zakhryapin, Kirill Antyukh) (2 times)
 December 11 & 12, 2021: EC #4 in  Sigulda
 2-man Bobsleigh winners:  Richard Oelsner & Henrik Bosse (1st) /  Richard Oelsner & Georg Fleischhauer (2nd)
 2-woman Bobsleigh winners:  Stephanie Schneider & Claudia Schüßler
 January 6 – 8: EC #5 in  Innsbruck
 2-man Bobsleigh winners:  Richard Oelsner & Georg Fleischhauer
 2-woman Bobsleigh winners:  Maureen Zimmer & Neele Schuten
 4-man Bobsleigh winners:  (Jonas Jannusch, Felix Dahms, Benedikt Hertel, Christian Röder) (1st) /  (Patrick Baumgartner, Lorenzo Bilotti, Alex Verginer, Eric Fantazzini) (2nd)
 January 14 – 16: EC #6 in  Winterberg (final)
 2-man Bobsleigh winners:  Richard Oelsner & Henrik Bosse
 2-woman Bobsleigh winners:  Stephanie Schneider & Tamara Seer
 4-man Bobsleigh winners:  (Nico Semmler, Oliver Peschk, Rupert Schenk, Marvin Paul)

2021–22 IBSF Skeleton European Cup
 November 12 & 13, 2021: EC #1 in  Lillehammer
 Men's winner:  Zheng Yin (2 times)
 Women's winner:  Li Yuxi (2 times)
 November 19 & 20, 2021: EC #2 in  Winterberg
 Men's winner:  Zheng Yin (2 times)
 Women's winner:  Li Yuxi (2 times)
 December 3, 2021: EC #3 in  Innsbruck
 Winners:  Stefan Röttig (m) /  Mystique Ro (f)
 December 13 & 14, 2021: EC #4 in  Sigulda
 Men's winner:  Dmitrii Grevtsev (2 times) 
 Women's winner  Polina Tiurina (2 times)
 January 9 –: EC #5 in  Altenberg
 Winners:  Stefan Röttig (m) /  Agathe Bessard (f)

2021–22 IBSF Bobsleigh North American Cup
 November 7–9, 2021: NAC #1 in  Whistler
 2-man Bobsleigh winners:  Taylor Austin / Daniel Sunderland (2 times) /  Taylor Austin / Chris Patrician
 November 12–14, 2021: NAC #2 in  Whistler
 2-woman Bobsleigh winners:  Alysia Rissling / Wilson Eden (3 times)
 4-man Bobsleigh winners:  (Taylor Austin, Chris Patrician, Shaquille Murray-Lawrence, Daniel Sunderland) (3 times)
 November 27–29, 2021: NAC #3 in  Park City
 2-man Bobsleigh winners:  Frank Delduca & Boone Niederhofer (1st) /  Frank Delduca & Kyle Wilcox
 2-woman Bobsleigh winners:  Brittany Reinbolt & Nicole Brungardt (2 times)
 4-man Bobsleigh winners:  (Frank Delduca, Adrian Adams, Kyle Wilcox, Boone Niederhofer) (1st) /  (Taylor Austin, Shaquille Murray-Lawrence, Mark Mlakar, Chris Patrician) (2nd)
 December 13 – 20, 2021: NAC #4 & #5 in  Lake Placid
 2-man Bobsleigh winners:  Frank Delduca & Kyle Wilcox (1st) /  Frank Delduca & Boone Niederhofer (2nd) /  Frank Delduca & Manteo Mitchell (3rd)
 2-woman Bobsleigh winners:  Nicole Vogt & Jasmine Jones (1st) /  Nicole Vogt & Nicole Brungardt (2nd) /  Nicole Vogt & Emily Renna (3rd)
 4-man Bobsleigh winners:  (Taylor Austin, Chris Patrician, Shaquille Murray-Lawrence, Daniel Sunderland) (2 times) /  (Frank Delduca, Adrian Adams, Kyle Wilcox, Boone Niederhofer) (2nd)

2021–22 IBSF Skeleton North American Cup
 November 7–9, 2021: NAC #1 in  Whistler
 Men's winners:  Alexander Schlintner (2 times) /  Evan Neufeldt 
 Women's winner:  Nicole Rocha Silveira (3 times)
 November 19 & 20, 2021: NAC #2 in  Park City
 Men's winner:  Felix Seibel (2 times)
 Women's winner:  Nicole Rocha Silveira (2 times)
 December 13 – 15, 2021: NAC #3 & #4 in  Lake Placid
 Men's winners:  Ander Mirambell (1st) /  Nicholas Timmings (2 times)
 Women's winner:  Kim Eun-ji (3 times)

Boccia
 December 3 – 14: 2022 World Boccia Championships in  Rio de Janeiro

2022 World Boccia Cup
 April 25 – May 1: WC #1 in  Montreal
 July 4 – 11: WC #2 in  Póvoa de Varzim
 August 8 – 16: WC #3 in  Taipei

2022 World Boccia Intercontinental Challenger
 April 2 – 10: Challenger #1 in  Zagreb
 August 1 – 7: Challenger #2 in  Veldhoven
 August 22 – 29: Challenger #3 in  Poznań
 September 6 – 14: Challenger #4 in  Olbia

Bodybuilding
 September 2 – 4: 2022 IFBB World Fit Model Championships in 
 October 13 – 17: 2022 IFBB World Fitness Championships in  Yeongju
 November 3 – 7: 2022 IFBB World Bodybuilding and Fitness Championships

Boules
 May 12 – 15: 2022 Pétanque World Championships in  Karlslunde
 Women 1x1:  Sylviane Métairon def.  Ranu Homniam, 13–10.
 Men 1x1:  Jesús Escacho def.  Diego Rizzi, 13–8.
 Women 2x2:  Aurelia Blazquez & Sara Díaz def.  Nur Thahira Tasnim & Nur Ain Syuhada, 13–2.
 Men 2x2:  Diego Rizzi & Alessio Cocciolo def.  Maiky Molinas & Joseph Molinas, 13–1.
 Mix 2x2:  Sarawut Sriboonpeng & Nantawan Fueangsanit def.  Sara Díaz & Javier Cardeñas, 13–4.

Bowls
 January 7 – 23: 2022 World Indoor Bowls Championship in  Great Yarmouth
 Open pairs:  Stewart Anderson &  Darren Burnett def.  Mark Dawes &  Jamie Chestney, 9–6, 7–11, 2–0.
 Mixed pairs:  Alison Merrien &  Paul Foster def.  Sandra Bailie &  Mark Dawes, 8–10, 9–6, 2–0.
 Women's singles:  Katherine Rednall def.  Alison Merrien, 13–2, 14–2.
 Men's singles:  Les Gillett def.  Paul Foster, 8–7, 4–12, 1–2.

Boxing
 January 20 – 30: ASBC Asian U22 Boxing Championships in  Tashkent
 Minimumweight winners:  Asilbek Jalilov (m) /  Farzona Fozilova (f)
 Women's Light Flyweight winner:  Sabina Bobokulova
 Flyweight winners:  Mukhammadkodir Mamirjonov (m) /  Feruza Kazakova (f)
 Bantamweight winners:  Shakhzod Muzafarov (m) /  Enkhjargal Munguntsetseg (f)
 Featherweight winners:  Dilshod Abdumurodov (m) /  Sena Irie (f)
 Lightweight winners:  Khurshidbek Rasuljonov (m) /  Badmaarag Ganzong (f)
 Light Welterweight winners:  Ruslan Abdullaev (m) /  Mokhinabonu Abdullaeva (f)
 Men's Welterweight winner:  Javlonbek Yuldashev
 Men's Light Middleweight winner:  Aziz Tojiev
 Men's Middleweight winner:  Abdulaziz Abdupattaev
 Men's Light Heavyweight winner:  Jasurbek Yuldoshev
 Men's Cruiserweight winner:  Timur Merjanov
 Men's Heavyweight winner:  Davlat Boltaev
 Men's Super Heavyweight winner:  Jakhongir Zokirov
 May 8 – 20: 2022 IBA Women's World Boxing Championships in  Istanbul
 March 22 – April 2: AMBC American Boxing Championships in  Guayaquil
 September 29 – October 9: 2022 FISU University World Cup Combat Sports in  Ekaterinburg
 November: 2022 AIBA Youth World Boxing Championships in  Alicante

Bridge
 March 27 – April 9: 2021 World Bridge Team Championships in  Salsomaggiore Terme
 September 2 – 17: 2022 World Bridge Series in  Wrocław

Canadian football
June 9 – November 13: 2022 CFL season
November 20: 109th Grey Cup in  Regina - Toronto Argonauts 24, Winnipeg Blue Bombers 23
August 27 – November 19: 2022 U Sports football season
November 26: 57th Vanier Cup in  London - Laval 30, Saskatchewan 24

Canoeing
 January 28 – 30: 2022 Oceania Canoe Slalom Championships in  Penrith
 K1 winners:  Lucien Delfour (m) /  Jessica Fox (f)
 C1 winners:  Tristan Carter (m) /  Jessica Fox (f)
 June 2 – 5: 2022 Wildwater Canoeing World Championships in  Treignac
 June 27 – July 2: 2022 Canoe Freestyle World Championships in  Nottingham
 July 26 – 31: 2022 Canoe Slalom World Championships in  Augsburg
 August 3 – 7: 2022 Canoe Sprint World Championships in  Halifax
 August 16 – 21: 2022 Canoe Polo World Championships in  Saint-Omer
 September 22 – 25: 2022 ICF Dragon Boat World Championships in  Ternopil
 September 29 – October 2: 2022 Canoe Marathon World Championships in  Ponte de Lima

Casting
 August 31 – September 4: 2022 World Championship in Castingsport in  Tallinn

Cheerleading
April 20 – 22: 2022 World Cheerleading Championships in  Orlando

Chess
 TBC: Women's Candidates Tournament 2022
 June: Candidates Tournament 2022
 July 26 – August 8: World Chess Olympiad 2022
 October 20 – 30: World Amateur Chess Championship 2022 in 
 November: World Team Chess Championship 2022

Cricket

 October 5 – 10, 2021: 2021 Summer T20 Bash in 
 Two non-T20I twenty-over matches were also played, with Scotland beating Ireland by five wickets, and Namibia recording an 84 run victory over Papua New Guinea.
 January 14 – February 5: 2022 ICC Under-19 Cricket World Cup in 
 January 18 – 24: 2022 Commonwealth Games Cricket Qualifier in 
 TBD for February: 2022 Uganda Cricket World Cup Challenge League B in 
 March 4 – April 3: 2022 Women's Cricket World Cup in 
 October 16 – November 13: 2022 ICC Men's T20 World Cup in

2021–2023 ICC World Test Championship – Test series
 November 17 – December 7, 2021: New Zealand cricket team in India in 2021–22 in  Mumbai
 India win the Test series 1–0.
 November 21 – December 3, 2021: West Indian cricket team in Sri Lanka in 2021–22 in  Galle
 Sri Lanka won the 2-match series 2–0.
 November 26 – December 8, 2021: Pakistani cricket team in Bangladesh in 2021–22 in  Dhaka
 Pakistan win the Test series 2–0.
 December 8, 2021 – January 18: 2021–22 Ashes series in  Brisbane, Adelaide, Melbourne, Sydney and Hobart
 Australia successfully retained the Ashes by winning the first three Test matches.
 December 26, 2021 – January 15: Indian cricket team in South Africa in 2021–22 in  Centurion, Johannesburg and Cape Town
 South Africa won the 3-match series 2–1.
 January 1 – 15: Bangladeshi cricket team in New Zealand in 2021–22 in  Tauranga and Christchurch
 2-match series drawn 1–1.
 February 17 – March 1: South African cricket team in New Zealand in 2021–22 in  Christchurch and Wellington
 2-match series drawn 1–1.
 February 25 – March 9: Sri Lankan cricket team in India in 2021–22 in  Bangalore and Mohali
 India won the 2-match series 2–0.
 March 3 – 25: Australian cricket team in Pakistan in 2021–22 in  Karachi, Rawalpindi and Lahore
 Australia won the 3-match series 1–0.
 West Indies won the 3-match series 1–0.
 March 30 – April 11: Bangladeshi cricket team in South Africa in 2021–22 in  TBD

2020–2023 ICC Cricket World Cup Super League – ODI series
 September 1 – 5, 2021: Afghan cricket team in Pakistan in 2021–22 in  Kabul
 The tour was postponed due to the situation in Afghanistan, the logistics in travelling, and for the welfare of the team.
 September 2 – 7, 2021: South African cricket team in Sri Lanka in 2021–22 in  Colombo
 Sri Lanka won the 3-match series 2–1.
 November 26 – December 1, 2021: Dutch cricket team in South Africa in 2021–22 in  Centurion
 The second and third ODIs were postponed due to the COVID-19 pandemic.
 December 18 – 22, 2021: West Indian cricket team in Pakistan in 2021–22 in  Karachi
 The ODI matches were postponed following multiple cases of COVID-19 the West Indies team and support staff.
 January 8 – 14: Irish cricket team in the West Indies in 2021–22 in  Kingston
 Ireland won the 3-match series 2–1.
 January 16 – 21: Zimbabwean cricket team in Sri Lanka in 2021–22 in  Kandy
 Sri Lanka won the 3-match series 2–1.
 January 21 – 25: Dutch cricket team against Afghanistan in Qatar in 2021–22 in  Doha
 Afghanistan won the 3-match series 3–0.
 January 30 – February 5: New Zealand cricket team in Australia in 2021–22 in  Perth, Hobart and Sydney
 Postponed.
 February 6 – 12: West Indian cricket team in India in 2021–22 in  Ahmedabad, Jaipur and Kolkata
 India won the 3-match series 3–0.
 March 18 – 23: Bangladeshi cricket team in South Africa in 2021–22 in  TBD
 Bangladesh won the 3-match series 2–1.
 March 29 – April 2: Australian cricket team in Pakistan in 2021–22 in  Lahore
 Pakistan won the 3-match series 2–1.
 March 29 – April 4: Dutch cricket team in New Zealand in 2021–22 in  Dunedin and Hamilton
 New Zealand won the 3-match series 3–0.
 TBD: Afghan cricket team in Zimbabwe in 2021–22 in  TBD location
 TBD: Afghan cricket team in Bangladesh in 2021–22 in  TBD location
 TBD: Afghan cricket team in India in 2021–22 in  TBD location

2019–2023 ICC Cricket World Cup League 2 – Tri-series
 September 13 – 20, 2021: 2021 Oman Tri-Nation Series (round 6) in  Muscat
 Of the six matches that were played, host Oman won three of their fixtures, with Nepal winning two matches and the United States winning one.
 September 25 – October 2, 2021: 2021 Oman Tri-Nation Series (round 7) in  Muscat
 Scotland won their first three matches, with Oman winning two of their fixtures, and Papua New Guinea remaining winless in the Cricket World Cup League 2 tournament. The sixth and final match of the series, between Oman and Scotland, was abandoned mid-way through Scotland's innings due to heavy rain caused by Cyclone Shaheen.
 November 26 – December 6, 2021: 2021 Namibia Tri-Nation Series in  Windhoek
 The series was called off after the first two matches due to the COVID-19 pandemic.
 TBD for February: 2022 Nepal Tri-Nation Series in 
 TBD for March: 2022 Namibia Tri-Nation Series (March) in  Windhoek
 TBD: 2021 United Arab Emirates Tri-Nation Series in  TBD

Cross-country skiing

Cue sports

Carom billiards
 March 10 – 13: 2022 UMB World Three-cushion Championship for National Teams in  Viersen
 Winner:  Turkey, Runner-up:  Colombia 
 March 15 – 20: 2022 UMB World Five-pins Championship in  Calangianus
 September 20 – 22: 2022 UMB World Three-cushion Championship for Ladies in 
 November 9 – 13: 2022 UMB World Three-cushion Championship in

Pool
 March 2 – 12: 2022 European Pool Championships in  Laško
 March 28 – April 1: 2022 WPA World Ten-ball Championship in  Las Vegas
 Winner:  Wojciech Szewczyk, Runner-up:  Christopher Tévez
 July 25 – August 1: 2022 Youth European Pool Championships in  Petrich
 September 6 – 11: 2022 WPA World Teams Ten-ball Championship in  Klagenfurt
 September 6 – 11: 2022 WPA World Women's Ten-ball Championship in  Klagenfurt
 November 30 – December 3: 2022 Mosconi Cup in  Las Vegas

2022 Euro Tour
 February 26 – 28: Laško Open in  Laško
 Winner:  Wiktor Zieliński, Runner-up:  Joshua Filler 
 April 29 – May 2: Treviso Open in 
 June 24 – 27: St. Johann im Pongau Open in 
 August 6 – 8: Petrich Open in

2022 US Pro Billiard Series
 January 11 – 16: Arizona Open in  Tucson
 Winner:  Fedor Gorst, Runner-up:  Roland Garcia
 February 9 – 12: Wisconsin Open in  Baraboo
 Winner:  Alex Kazakis, Runner-up:  Bader Alawadhi
 March 23 – 26: Las Vegas Open in  Las Vegas
Winnder:  Aloysius Yapp, Runner-up:  Wojciech Szewczyk
 September 21 – 24: Michigan Open in  Battle Creek
 October 19 – 22: Ohio Open in  Wilmington
 TBD: Puerto Rico Open in  San Juan (final)

Snooker

 February 10 – 14: 2022 World Women's Snooker Championship in  Sheffield
 Winner:  Nutcharut Wongharuthai; runner-up:  Wendy Jans
 April 16 – May 2: 2022 World Snooker Championship in  Sheffield
 Winner:  Ronnie O'Sullivan; runner-up:  Judd Trump

Curling

2022 Winter Olympics
 February 2 – 20: Curling at the 2022 Winter Olympics in  Beijing

2022 Winter Paralympics
 March 5 – 12: Wheelchair curling at the 2022 Winter Paralympics in  Beijing

2021–22 curling season
 March 19 – 27: 2022 World Women's Curling Championship in  Prince George
 Final placements: : , : , : 
 April 2 – 10: 2022 World Men's Curling Championship in  Las Vegas
 Final placements: : , : , : 
 April 23 – 30: 2022 World Senior Curling Championships in  Geneva
 April 23 – 30: 2022 World Mixed Doubles Curling Championship in  Geneva
 Final placements: : , : , : 
 May 1 – 6: 2022 European Curling Championships in  Vilnius
 May 15 – 22: 2022 World Junior Curling Championships in  Jönköping

2021–2022 Grand Slam of Curling
 October 19 – 24, 2021: Masters in  Oakville
 Men's:  Bruce Mouat defeated  Brad Jacobs, 7–5.
 Women's:  Tracy Fleury defeated  Jennifer Jones, 9–7.
 November 2 – 7, 2021: BOOST National in  Chestermere
 Men's:  Brad Gushue defeated  Bruce Mouat, 5–2.
 Women's:  Anna Hasselborg defeated  Tracy Fleury, 9–6.
 January 14 – 16: Meridian Open in  Camrose
 Cancelled.
 April 12 – 17: Princess Auto Players' Championship in  Toronto
 Men's:  Bruce Mouat defeated  Niklas Edin, 8–3
 Women's:  Anna Hasselborg defeated  Kerri Einarson, 6–5
 May 3 – 8: KIOTI Tractor Champions Cup in  Olds
 Men's:  Brad Gushue defeated  Kevin Koe, 8–5
 Women's:  Kerri Einarson defeated  Gim Un-chi, 10–6

Cycling — BMX

International BMX events
 July 26 – 31: 2022 UCI BMX World Championships in  Nantes

2022 UCI BMX Racing World Cup 
 May 28 & 29: #1 in  Glasgow
 Men's Elite winners:  Diego Arboleda (Round 1) /  Jérémy Rencurel (Round 2)
 Women's Elite winner:  Laura Smulders (Round 1 & 2)

2022 UCI BMX Freestyle World Cup 
 May 25 – 29: #1 in  Montpellier
 Park winners:  Rim Nakamura (m) /  Lizsurley Villegas Serna (f)
 Flatland winners:  Kio Hayakawa (m) /  Julia Preuss (f)

Cycling — Cross

Continental and World Championships
 November 6 & 7, 2021: UEC European Cyclo-cross Championships in  Col du Vam
 Elite winners:  Lars van der Haar (m) /  Lucinda Brand (f)
 U23 winners:  Ryan Kamp (m) /  Shirin van Anrooij (f)
 Juniors winners:  Aaron Dockx (m) /  Zoe Bäckstedt (f)
 December 3 & 4, 2021: UCI Masters Cyclo-cross World Championships in  East Suffolk
 Masters 33–39 winners:  Graham Briggs (m) /  Cindy Törber (f)
 Masters 40–44 winners:  Lewis Craven (m) /  Ceris Gilfillan (f)
 Masters 45–49 winners:  Adrian Lansley (m) /  Kate Eedy (f)
 Masters 50–54 winners:  Jens Schwedler (m) /  Helen Pattinson (f)
 Masters 55–59 winners:  Murray Swanson (m) /  Corinne Piloot (f)
 Masters 60–64 winners:  Jean Malot (m) /  Nicola Davies (f)
 Masters 65–69 winners:  Peter Harris (m) /  Lydia Gould
 Men's Masters 70–74 winner:  Francisco Sánchez De Diego
 Women's Masters 70+ winner:  Maurine Sweeney
 Men's Masters Open 75–79 winner:  John Elgart
 Men's Masters Open 80+ winner:  John Ginley
 December 4 & 5, 2021: Pan American Cyclo-cross Championships in  Garland
 Elite winners:  Eric Brunner (m) /  Raylyn Nuss (f)
 U23 winners:  Scott Funston (m) /  Madigan Munro (f)
 Juniors winners:  Jack Spranger (m) /  Ava Holmgren (f)
 January 29 & 30: 2022 UCI Cyclo-cross World Championships in  Fayetteville
 Elite winners:  Tom Pidcock (m) /  Marianne Vos (f)
 U23 winners:  Joran Wyseure (m) /  Puck Pieterse (f)
 Juniors winners:  Jan Christen (m) /  Zoe Bäckstedt (f)

2021–22 UCI Cyclo-cross World Cup
 October 10, 2021: WC #1 in  Waterloo
 Elite winners:  Eli Iserbyt (m) /  Marianne Vos (f)
 October 13, 2021: WC #2 in  Fayetteville
 Elite winners:  Quinten Hermans (m) /  Lucinda Brand (f)
 October 17, 2021: WC #3 in  Iowa City
 Elite winners:  Eli Iserbyt (m) /  Marianne Vos (f)
 October 24, 2021: WC #4 in  Zonhoven
 Elite winners:  Toon Aerts (m) /  Denise Betsema (f)
 October 31, 2021: WC #5 in  Overijse
 Elite winners:  Eli Iserbyt (m) /  Kata Blanka Vas (f)
 Juniors winner:  David Haverdings
 November 14, 2021: WC #6 in  Tábor
 Elite winners:  Lars van der Haar (m) /  Lucinda Brand (f)
 U23 winner:  Mees Hendrikx
 Juniors winners:  David Haverdings (m) /  Zoe Bäckstedt (f)
 November 21, 2021: WC #7 in  Koksijde
 Elite winners:  Eli Iserbyt (m) /  Annemarie Worst (f)
 November 28, 2021: WC #8 in  Besançon
 Elite winners:  Eli Iserbyt (m) /  Lucinda Brand (f)
 December 5, 2021: WC #9 in  Antwerpen
 Cancelled.
 December 12, 2021: WC #10 in  Val di Sole
 Elite winners:  Wout van Aert (m) /  Fem van Empel (f)
 December 18, 2021: WC #11 in  Rucphen
 Elite winners:  Tom Pidcock (m) /  Marianne Vos (f)
 December 19, 2021: WC #12 in  Namur
 Elite winners:  Michael Vanthourenhout (m) /  Lucinda Brand (f)
 U23 winner:  Pim Ronhaar
 Juniors winners:  David Haverdings (m) /  Zoe Bäckstedt (f)
 December 26, 2021: WC #13 in  Dendermonde
 Elite winners:  Wout van Aert (m) /  Lucinda Brand (f)
 U23 winner:  Cameron Mason
 Juniors winners:  David Haverdings (m) /  Zoe Bäckstedt (f)
 January 2: WC #14 in  Hulst
 Elite winners:  Tom Pidcock (m) /  Lucinda Brand (f)
 January 16: WC #15 in  Flamanville
 Elite winners:  Eli Iserbyt (m) /  Fem van Empel (f)
 U23 winner:  Emiel Verstrynge
 Juniors winners:  David Haverdings (m) /  Leonie Bentveld (f)
 January 23: WC #16 in  Hoogerheide (final)
 Elite winners:  Eli Iserbyt (m) /  Marianne Vos (f)
 Elite World Cup winners:  Eli Iserbyt (m) /  Lucinda Brand (f)

2021-2022 Cyclo-cross Superprestige
 October 3, 2021: Superprestige #1 in  Gieten
 Elite winners:  Toon Aerts (m) /  Lucinda Brand (f)
 Juniors winners:  David Haverdings (m) /  Zoe Bäckstedt (f)
 October 23, 2021: Superprestige #2 in  Ruddervoorde
 Elite winners:  Eli Iserbyt (m) /  Denise Betsema (f)
 Juniors winner:  David Haverdings
 November 11, 2021: Superprestige #3 in  Niel
 Elite winners:  Eli Iserbyt (m) /  Lucinda Brand (f)
 Juniors winner:  Senne Bauwens
 November 20, 2021: Superprestige #4 in  Merksplas
 Elite winners:  Eli Iserbyt (m) /  Lucinda Brand (f)
 Juniors winner:  David Haverdings
 December 4, 2021: Superprestige #5 in  Boom
 Elite winners:  Wout van Aert (m) /  Lucinda Brand (f)
 Juniors winner:  Yordi Corsus
 December 27, 2021: Superprestige #6 in  Heusden-Zolder
 Elite winners:  Wout van Aert (m) /  Lucinda Brand (f)
 Juniors winner:  David Haverdings
 December 29, 2021: Superprestige #7 in  Diegem
 Cancelled.
 February 12: Superprestige #8 in  Gavere (final)
 Elite winners:  Lars van der Haar (m) /  Lucinda Brand (f)
 Juniors winner:  David Haverdings

November 1, 2021: X²O Badkamers Trofee #1 in  Audenarde
 Elite winners:  Eli Iserbyt (m) /  Clara Honsinger (f)
 U23 winner:  Pim Ronhaar
 Juniors winner:  Aaron Dockx
 November 27, 2021: X²O Badkamers Trofee #2 in  Kortrijk
 Elite winners:  Toon Aerts (m) /  Lucinda Brand (f)
 U23 winner:  Pim Ronhaar
 Juniors winner:  Kenay De Moyer
 December 30, 2021: X²O Badkamers Trofee #3 in  Wuustwezel
 Elite winners:  Wout van Aert (m) /  Lucinda Brand (f)
 U23 winner:  Thibau Nys
 Juniors winners:  Kenay De Moyer (m) /  Leonie Bentveld (f)
 January 1: X²O Badkamers Trofee #4 in  Baal
 Elite winners:  Wout van Aert (m) /  Lucinda Brand (f)
 U23 winner:  Thibau Nys
 Juniors winners:  David Haverdings (m) /  Leonie Bentveld (f)
 January 5: X²O Badkamers Trofee #5 in  Herentals
 Elite winners:  Wout van Aert (m) /  Lucinda Brand (f)
 U23 winner:  Thibau Nys
 Juniors winners:  David Haverdings (m) /  Leonie Bentveld (f)
 January 22: X²O Badkamers Trofee #6 in  Hamme 
 Elite winners:  Laurens Sweeck (m) /  Lucinda Brand (f)
 U23 winner:  Joran Wyseure
 Men's Juniors winner:  David Haverdings
 February 6: X²O Badkamers Trofee #7 in  Lille 
 Elite winners:  Toon Aerts (m) /  Lucinda Brand (f)
 U23 winner:  Pim Ronhaar
 Juniors winners:  Yordi Corsus (m) /  Zoe Bäckstedt
 February 13: X²O Badkamers Trofee #8 in  Brussels (final)
 Elite winners:  Michael Vanthourenhout (m) /  Denise Betsema (f)
 U23 winner:  Pim Ronhaar
 Men's Juniors winner:  David Haverdings

September 28, 2021: Toi Toi Cup #1 in  Mladá Boleslav
 Elite winners:  Michael Boroš (m) /  Pavla Havlíková (f)
 Juniors winners:  Václav Ježek (m) /  Eliška Hanáková (f)
 October 2, 2021: Toi Toi Cup #2 in  Hlinsko
 Elite winners:  Marek Konwa (m) /  Kristýna Zemanová (f)
 Juniors winners:  Václav Ježek (m) /  Vanda Dlasková (f)
 October 9, 2021: Toi Toi Cup #3 in  Slaný
 Elite winners:  Michael Boroš (m) /  Kristýna Zemanová (f)
 Juniors winners:  Václav Ježek (m) /  Eliška Hanáková (f)
 October 16, 2021: Toi Toi Cup #4 in  Rýmařov
 Elite winners:  Michael Boroš (m) /  Kristýna Zemanová (f)
 Juniors winners:  Ondřej Novotný (m) /  Eliška Hanáková (f)
 November 17, 2021: Toi Toi Cup #5 in  Veselí nad Lužnicí
 Elite winners:  Michael Boroš (m) /  Kristýna Zemanová (f)
 Juniors winners:  Adam Seeman (m) /  Leonie Bentveld (f)
 December 11, 2021: Toi Toi Cup #6 in  Jičín (final)
 Elite winners:  Michael Boroš (m) /  Judith Krahl (f)

September 11, 2021: Ethias Cross #1 in  Lokeren
 Elite winners:  Eli Iserbyt (m) /  Denise Betsema (f)
 Juniors winner:  Yordi Corsus
 September 18, 2021: Ethias Cross #2 in  Beringen
 Elite winners:  Eli Iserbyt (m) /  Yara Kastelijn (f)
 Juniors winner:  Aaron Dockx
 September 18, 2021: Ethias Cross #3 in  Bredene
 Elite winners:  Eli Iserbyt (m) /  Denise Betsema (f)
 Juniors winner:  Aaron Dockx
 October 2, 2021: Ethias Cross #4 in  Meulebeke
 Elite winners:  Michael Vanthourenhout (m) /  Sanne Cant (f)
 Juniors winner:  Kenay De Moyer
 November 13, 2021: Ethias Cross #5 in  Leuven
 Elite winners:  Laurens Sweeck (m) /  Anna Kay (f)
 Juniors winner:  Robby Dhondt
 December 11, 2021: Ethias Cross #6 in  Essen
 Elite winners:  Wout Van Aert (m) /  Zoe Bäckstedt (f)
 Juniors winner:  David Haverdings
 February 5: Ethias Cross #7 in  Kruibeke 
 Cancelled.
 February 5: Ethias Cross #7 in  Maldegem 
 Elite winners:  Laurens Sweeck (m) /  Annemarie Worst (f)
 Juniors winner:  Kenay De Moyer
 February 19: Ethias Cross #8 in  Sint-Niklaas  (final)
 Elite winners:  Michael Vanthourenhout (m) /  Lucinda Brand (f)
 Juniors winner:  David Haverdings

September 19, 2021: National Trophy Series #1 in  Derby
 Elite winners:  Lewis Askey (m) /  Amira Mellor (f)
 Juniors winners:  Callum Laborde (m) /  Ella MacLean-Howell (f)
 October 10, 2021: National Trophy Series #2 in  Milnthorpe
 Elite winners:  Joseph Blackmore (m) /  Amira Mellor (f)
 Juniors winners:  Nathan Smith (m) /  Ella MacLean-Howell (f)
 October 24, 2021: National Trophy Series #3 in  Falkirk
 Elite winners:  Corran Carrick-Anderson (m) /  Josie Nelson (f)
 Juniors winners:  Nathan Smith (m) /  Ella MacLean-Howell (f)
 November 21, 2021: National Trophy Series #4 in  Sunderland
 Elite winners:  Rory Mcguire (m) /  Amira Mellor (f)
 Juniors winners:  Nathan Smith (m) /  Ella MacLean-Howell (f)
 December 11, 2021: National Trophy Series #5 in  Gravesend
 Elite winners:  Cameron Mason (m) /  Millie Couzens (f)
 Juniors winners:  Nathan Smith (m) /  Emily Carrick-Anderson (f)
 January 16: National Trophy Series #6 in  Skipton (final)
 Elite winners:  Thomas Mein (m) /  Anna Kay (f)
 Juniors winners:  Nathan Smith (m) /  Ella MacLean-Howell (f)

September 25, 2021: USCX Cyclocross Series #1 in  Rochester
 Elite winners:  Vincent Baestaens (m) /  Maghalie Rochette (f)
 Juniors winners:  Andrew August (m) /  Katherine Sarkisov (f)
 September 26, 2021: USCX Cyclocross Series #2 in  Rochester
 Elite winners:  Vincent Baestaens (m) /  Maghalie Rochette (f)
 Juniors winners:  Frank O'Reilly (m) /  Katherine Sarkisov (f)
 October 2, 2021: USCX Cyclocross Series #3 in  Baltimore
 Elite winners:  Vincent Baestaens (m) /  Clara Honsinger (f)
 Juniors winners:  Marcis Shelton (m) /  Katherine Sarkisov (f)
 October 3, 2021: USCX Cyclocross Series #4 in  Baltimore
 Elite winners:  Vincent Baestaens (m) /  Maghalie Rochette (f)
 Juniors winners:  Frank O'Reilly (m) /  Chloe Frazer (f)
 October 15, 2021: USCX Cyclocross Series #5 in  Iowa City
 Elite winners:  Vincent Baestaens (m) /  Shirin van Anrooij (f)
 Juniors winners:  Jack Spranger (m) /  Isabella Holmgren (f)
 October 16, 2021: USCX Cyclocross Series #6 in  Iowa City
 Elite winners:  Niels Vandeputte (m) /  Manon Bakker (f)
 Juniors winners:  Jack Spranger (m) /  Katherine Sarkisov (f)
 October 23, 2021: USCX Cyclocross Series #7 in  Mason
 Elite winners:  Eric Brunner (m) /  Maghalie Rochette (f)
 Juniors winners:  Jack Spranger (m) /  Ava Holmgren (f)
 October 24, 2021: USCX Cyclocross Series #8 in  Mason (final)
 Elite winners:  Kerry Werner (m) /  Maghalie Rochette (f)
 Juniors winners:  Ian Ackert (m) /  Isabella Holmgren (f)

Cycling — Indoor
 November 4 – 6: 2022 UCI Indoor Cycling World Championships in  Ghent

Cycling — Mountain bike
 August 24 – 28: 2022 UCI Mountain Bike World Championships in  Les Gets
 September 17 & 18: 2022 UCI Mountain Bike Marathon World Championships in  Haderslev
 October 2: 2022 UCI Mountain Bike Eliminator World Championships in  Barcelona

2022 UCI Mountain Bike World Cup
 March 26 & 27: #1 in  Lourdes
DHI winners:  Amaury Pierron (m) /  Camille Balanche (f)
April 8 – 10: #2 in  Petrópolis
XCC winners:  Alan Hatherly (m) /  Pauline Ferrand-Prévot (f)
XCO winners:  Nino Schurter (m) /  Rebecca McConnell (f)
May 6 – 8: #3 in  Albstadt
XCC winners:  Sam Gaze (m) /  Rebecca McConnell (f)
XCO winners:  Tom Pidcock (m) /  Rebecca McConnell (f)
May 13 – 15: #4 in  Nové Město na Moravě
XCC winners:  Luca Schwarzbauer (m) /  Jolanda Neff (f)
XCO winners:  Tom Pidcock (m) /  Rebecca McConnell (f)
 May 21 & 22: #5 in  Fort William
DHI winners:  Amaury Pierron (m) /  Nina Hoffmann (f)

Cycling — Road 
 March 23 – 26: 2022 African Road Cycling Championships in  Cairo
 Seniors ITT winners:  Gustav Basson (m) /  Nesrine Houili (f)
 Juniors ITT winners:  Aklilu Arefayne (m) /  Caitlin Thompson (f)
 Seniors Team Time Trial winners:  (m) /  (f)
 Juniors Team Time Trial winners:  (m) /  (f)
 August 14 – 21: 2022 European Road Cycling Championships in  Munich
 September 18 – 25: 2022 UCI Road World Championships in  Wollongong

2022 UCI World Tour
 February 20 – 26:  UAE Tour
 Winner:  Tadej Pogačar
 February 26:  2022 Omloop Het Nieuwsblad
 Winner:  Wout van Aert
 March 5:  2022 Strade Bianche
 Winner:  Matej Mohorič
 March 6 – 13:  2022 Paris–Nice
 Winner:  Primož Roglič
 March 7 – 13:  2022 Tirreno–Adriatico
 Winner:  Tadej Pogačar
 March 19:  2022 Milan–San Remo
 Winner:  Matej Mohorič
 March 21 – 27:  2022 Volta a Catalunya
 Winner:  Sergio Higuita
 March 23:  2022 Classic Brugge–De Panne
 Winner:  Tim Merlier
 March 25:  2022 E3 Saxo Bank Classic
 Winner:  Wout van Aert
 March 27:  2022 Gent–Wevelgem
 Winner:  Biniam Girmay
 March 30:  2022 Dwars door Vlaanderen
 Winner:  Mathieu van der Poel
 April 3:  2022 Tour of Flanders
 Winner:  Mathieu van der Poel
 April 4 – 9:  2022 Tour of the Basque Country
 Winner:  Daniel Martínez
 April 10:  2022 Amstel Gold Race
 Winner:  Michał Kwiatkowski
 April 17:  2022 Paris–Roubaix
 Winner:  Dylan van Baarle
 April 20:  2022 La Flèche Wallonne
 Winner:  Dylan Teuns
 April 24:  2022 Liège–Bastogne–Liège
 Winner:  Remco Evenepoel
 April 26 – May 1:  2022 Tour de Romandie
 Winner:  Aleksandr Vlasov
 May 1:  2022 Eschborn–Frankfurt
 Winner:  Sam Bennett
 May 6 – 29:  2022 Giro d'Italia
 Winner:  Jai Hindley
 June 5 – 12:  2022 Critérium du Dauphiné
 Winner:  Primož Roglič
 June 12 – 19:  2022 Tour de Suisse
 Winner:  Geraint Thomas

2022 UCI ProSeries
 February 2 – 6:  2022 Volta a la Comunitat Valenciana
 Winner:  Aleksandr Vlasov
 February 10 – 13:  2022 Tour de la Provence
 Winner:  Nairo Quintana
 February 10 – 15:  2022 Tour of Oman
 Winner:  Jan Hirt
 February 13:  2022 Clásica de Almería
 Winner:  Alexander Kristoff
 February 16 – 20:  2022 Volta ao Algarve
 Winner:  Remco Evenepoel
 February 16 – 20:  2022 Vuelta a Andalucía
 Winner:  Wout Poels
 February 26:  2022 Faun-Ardèche Classic
 Winner:  Brandon McNulty
 February 27:  2022 Kuurne–Brussels–Kuurne
 Winner:  Fabio Jakobsen
 February 27:  2022 La Drôme Classic
 Winner:  Jonas Vingegaard
 March 2:  2022 Trofeo Laigueglia
 Winner:  Jan Polanc
 March 16:  2022 Nokere Koerse
 Winner:  Tim Merlier
 March 16:  2022 Milano–Torino
 Winner:  Mark Cavendish
 March 17:  2022 Grand Prix de Denain
 Winner:  Max Walscheid
 March 18:  2022 Bredene Koksijde Classic
 Winner:  Pascal Ackermann
 March 27:  2022 GP Industria & Artigianato di Larciano
 Winner:  Diego Ulissi
 April 2:  2022 GP Miguel Induráin
 Winner:  Warren Barguil
 April 6:  2022 Scheldeprijs
 Winner:  Alexander Kristoff
 April 10 – 17:  2022 Presidential Tour of Turkey
 Winner:  Patrick Bevin
 April 13:  2022 Brabantse Pijl
 Winner:  Magnus Sheffield
 April 18 – 22:  2022 Tour of the Alps
 Winner:  Romain Bardet
 May 3 – 8:  2022 Four Days of Dunkirk
 Winner:  Philippe Gilbert
 May 14:  2022 Grand Prix du Morbihan
 Winner:  Julien Simon
 May 15:  2022 Tro-Bro Léon
 Winner:  Hugo Hofstetter

2022 UCI Women's World Tour
 March 5:  2022 Strade Bianche
 Winner:  Lotte Kopecky
 March 12:  2022 Ronde van Drenthe
 Winner:  Lorena Wiebes
 March 20:  2022 Trofeo Alfredo Binda-Comune di Cittiglio
 Winner:  Elisa Balsamo
 March 24:  2022 Classic Brugge–De Panne
 Winner:  Elisa Balsamo
 March 27:  2022 Gent–Wevelgem
 Winner:  Elisa Balsamo
 April 3:  2022 Tour of Flanders
 Winner:  Lotte Kopecky
 April 10:  2022 Amstel Gold Race
 Winner:  Marta Cavalli
 April 16:  2022 Paris–Roubaix
 Winner:  Elisa Longo Borghini
 April 20:  2022 La Flèche Wallonne
 Winner:  Marta Cavalli
 April 24:  Liège–Bastogne–Liège
 Winner:  Annemiek van Vleuten

2022 UCI Women's ProSeries
 February 26:  2022 Omloop Het Nieuwsblad
 Winner:  Annemiek van Vleuten
 March 16:  2022 Nokere Koerse
 Winner:  Lorena Wiebes
 March 30:  2022 Dwars door Vlaanderen
 Winner:  Chiara Consonni
 April 13:  2022 Brabantse Pijl
 Winner:  Demi Vollering
 April 29 – May 1:  2022 Festival Elsy Jacobs
 Winner:  Marta Bastianelli

Cycling — Track

Darts

Professional Darts Corporation
 December 15, 2021 – January 3: 2022 PDC World Darts Championship in  London
  Peter Wright defeated  Michael Smith, 7–5.
 January 28 – 30: 2022 Masters in  Milton Keynes
  Joe Cullen  defeated  Dave Chisnall, 11–9.
 February 3 – June 13: 2022 Premier League Darts 
  Michael van Gerwen defeated  Joe Cullen, 11–10.
 March 4 – 6: 2022 UK Open in  Minehead
 Danny Noppert defeated  Michael Smith, 11–10.
 June 16 – 19: 2022 PDC World Cup of Darts in  Frankfurt
 (Damon Heta and Simon Whitlock) beat  (Gerwyn Price and Jonny Clayton), 3–1.
 July 16 – 24: 2022 World Matchplay in  Blackpool
 Michael van Gerwen defeated  Gerwyn Price, 18–14.
 October 2 – 8: 2022 World Grand Prix in  Leicester
 Michael van Gerwen defeated  Nathan Aspinall, 5–3.
 October 27 – 30: 2022 European Championship in  Dortmund
 Ross Smith defeated  Michael Smith, 11–8.
 November 12 – 20: 2022 Grand Slam of Darts in  Wolverhampton
 Michael Smith defeated  Nathan Aspinall, 16–5.
 November 26 – 27: 2022 Players Championship Finals in  Minehead
 Michael van Gerwen defeated  Rob Cross, 11–6.

World Series of Darts
 June 3 – 4: 2022 US Darts Masters in  New York
  defeated , 8–4.
 June 10 – 11: 2022 Nordic Darts Masters in  Copenhagen
  defeated , 11–5.
 June 24 – 25: 2022 Dutch Darts Masters in  Amsterdam
  defeated , 8–2.
 August 12 – 13: 2022 Queensland Darts Masters in  Townsville
  defeated , 8–5.
 August 19 – 20: 2022 New South Wales Darts Masters in  Wollongong
  defeated , 8–1.
 August 26 – 27: 2022 New Zealand Darts Masters in  Hamilton
  defeated , 8–4.
 September 16 – 18: 2022 World Series of Darts Finals in  Amsterdam
  defeated , 11–10.

World Darts Federation
 April 2 – 10: 2022 WDF World Darts Championship in  Frimley Green
 Men:  Neil Duff defeated  Thibault Tricole, 6–5.
 Women:  Beau Greaves defeated  Kirsty Hutchinson, 4–0.

2022 Masters
 February 18 – 20: Slovak Masters in  Šamorín
 postponed
 March 11 – 13: Budapest Masters in 
  Andras Borbely defeated  János Végső, 6–3.
 April 8 – 10: German Masters in  Kalkar
 April 30 – May 1: Denmark Masters in  Esbjerg
  James Richardson defeated  Jelle Klaasen, 6–5.
 July 30 & 31: Luxembourg Masters in  Luxembourg City
 October 2: Australian Masters in  Geelong
 November 4 – 6: Hungarian Masters in  Budapest (final)

Dancesport
 May 1: 2022 WDSF PD Latin World Championship in  Shijiazhuang

Dodgeball
TBD: 2022 World Dodgeball Championships

Disc golf
Men's PDGA Majors
 January 14 – 16: Shelly Sharpe Memorial in  Scottsdale
 Winners:  Anthony Barela (m) /  Jennifer Allen (f)
 January 21 – 23: DG1 Presents: The Winter Wonderland Amateur Showcase	in  Florida
 Winners:  Luke Callaghan (m) /  Jordan Lynds (f)
 February 19 & 20: The 2022 Gulf Coast Charity Open in  Tampa
 February 24 – 27: Las Vegas Challenge in  Henderson
 March 3 – 6: Memorial Championship in  Scottsdale
 March 3 – 5: 2022 NZ Disc Golf Championships in  Wellington
 March 11 – 13: St. Patrick's Classic – California Amateur State Championships in  Orangevale
 March 18: Daniel Boe Memorial – Weekend 1 in  Escondido
 March 18 – 20: The Open at Belton a DGPT Silver Series Event in  Belton
 March 18 – 20: St. Patrick's Classic in  Orangevale
 March 25 – 27: Auburn Amateur Driving in  Auburn
 March 25 – 27: Daniel Boe Memorial – Weekend 2 in  Escondido
 March 25 – 27: Sun King's Throw Down the Mountain X (Weekend 3) in  Brooksville
 March 26 & 27: Southern Michigan Open  Dexter

2022 Disc Golf Pro Tour
 February 24 – 27: Las Vegas Challenge in  Henderson
 March 11 – 13: Waco Annual Charity in  Waco
 March 24 – 27: 27th Annual Texas State Disc Golf Championship in  Tyler

2022 National Amateur Disc Golf Tour
 January 1 & 2: Zanfel Premier Tour #1 in  Mesa
 Winners:  Brad Wylam (m) /  Camella Aday (f)
 February 5 & 6: Zanfel Premier Tour #2 in  Appling

2022 PDGA Euro Tour
 March 4 – 6: ET#1 – Pro Forester in  Varaždin

Draughts
 January 5 – 20: 2022 World Draughts Championship match in  Eindhoven
  Roel Boomstra def.  Alexander Schwarzman
 May 1 – 5: 2022 Draughts World National Teams Championship in  Antalya
 May 8: 2022 Draughts World National Teams Championship Blitz in  Antalya
 July 10: 2022 Draughts World Championship Blitz in  Riga
 October 28 – November 5: 2022 Draughts World Youth Championship in  Antalya
 December 17 & 18: 2022 Draughts World Championship Rapid in  Warsaw

2022 Draughts World Cup
 January 22 – 29: WC #1 in  Ouagadougou
 Winners:  Jean Marc Ndjofang (m) /  Anastasia Arkhangelskaya (f)
 July 2 – 9: WC #2 in  Riga
 July 16 – 23: WC #3 in  Heerhugowaard
 October 16 – 21: WC #4 in  Beilen
 December 10 – 17: WC #5 in  Warsaw (final)

Equestrianism
 August 6 – 14: 2022 FEI World Equestrian Games in  Herning
 September 14 – 18: 2022 World Eventing Championships in  Pratoni del Vivaro
 September 15 – 18: 2022 Single Driving World Championship in  Le Pin-au-Haras
 September 21 – 25: 2022 Four-in-Hand Driving World Championship in  Pratoni del Vivaro
 October 22: 2022 FEI Endurance World Championship in  Verona

2021–22 FEI World Cup Dressage
 April 6 – 10: FEI World Cup Dressage final in  Leipzig

2021–22 FEI World Cup Jumping
 April 6 – 10: FEI World Cup Jumping final in  Leipzig

2021–22 FEI World Cup Driving
 April 6 – 10: FEI World Cup Jumping final in  Leipzig

2022 FEI Jumping Nations Cup
 January 19 – 23: Nations Cup #1 in  Abu Dhabi
 Winners: 
 March 16 – 20: Nations Cup #2 in  Coapexpan
 May 10 – 15: Nations Cup #3 in  San Juan Capistrano
 May 31 – June 5: Nations Cup #4 in  Langley
 June 3 – 6: Nations Cup #5 in  St. Gallen
 June 9 – 12: Nations Cup #6 in  Sopot
 June 23 – 26: Nations Cup #7 in  Rotterdam
 July 14 – 17: Nations Cup #8 in  Falsterbo
 July 27 – 31: Nations Cup #9 in  Twineham
 August 17 – 21: Nations Cup #10 in  Dublin
 September 29 – October 2: Nations Cup #11 in  Barcelona (final)

Fencing
July 15 – 23: 2022 World Fencing Championships in  Cairo

2021–22 Fencing World Cup
 November 19 – 21, 2021: WC #1 in  Tallinn
 Women's Épée winner:  Joséphine Jacques-André-Coquin
 Women's Team Épée winners: 
 November 19 – 21, 2021: WC #2 in  Bern
 Men's Épée winner:  Rubén Limardo
 Men's Team Épée winners: 
 December 10 – 12, 2021: WC #3 in  Saint-Maur-des-Fossés
 Women's Foil winner:  Alice Volpi
 Women's Team Foil winners: 
 January 14 – 16: WC #4 in  Paris
 Men's Foil winner:  Cheung Ka Long
 Men's Team Foil winners: 
 January 14 – 16: WC #5 in  Poznań
 Women's Foil winner:  Alice Volpi
 Women's Team Foil winners: 
 January 15 – 17: WC #6 in  Tbilisi
 Men's Sabre winner:  Sandro Bazadze
 Women's Sabre winner:  Caroline Queroli
 Men's Team Sabre winners: 
 Women's Team Sabre winners: 
 January 28 – 30: WC #7 in  Plovdiv
 Women's Sabre winner:  Anna Bashta
 Women's Team Sabre winners: 
 January 28 – 30: WC #8 in  Doha
 Men's Épée winner:  Yannick Borel
 Women's Épée winner:  Katrina Lehis
 February 11 – 13: WC #9 in  Sochi
 Men's Épée winner:  Valerio Cuomo
 Men's Team Épée winners: 
 February 11 – 13: WC #10 in  Barcelona
 Women's Épée winner:  Song Se-ra
 Women's Team Épée winners: 
 February 25 – 27: WC #11 in  Cairo
 Men's Foil winner:  Anton Borodachev
 Men's Team Foil winners: 
 February 25 – 27: WC #12 in  Guadalajara
 Women's Foil winner:  Alice Volpi
 Women's Team Foil winners: 
 March 4 – 6: WC #13 in  Athens
 Women's Sabre winner:  Anna Bashta
 Women's Team Sabre winners: 
 March 4 – 6: WC #14 in  Budapest
 Men's Épée winner:  Rubén Limardo
 Women's Épée winner:  Alberta Santuccio
 March 18 – 20: WC #15 in  Budapest
 Men's Sabre winner:  Áron Szilágyi
 Men's Team Sabre winners: 
 March 18 – 20: WC #16 in  Istanbul
 Women's Sabre winner:  Manon Apithy-Brunet
 Women's Team Sabre winners: 
 April 15 – 17: WC #17 in  Paris
 Men's Épée winner:  Nelson Lopez-Pourtier
 Men's Team Épée winners: 
 April 15 – 18: WC #18 in  Belgrade
 Men's Foil winner:  Tommaso Marini
 Women's Foil winner:  Anne Sauer
 Men's Team Foil winners: 
 Women's Team Foil winners: 
 April 29 – May 1: WC #19 in  Plovdiv
 Men's Foil winner:  Alessio Foconi
 Men's Team Foil winners: 
 April 29 – May 1: WC #20 in  Tauberbischofsheim
 Women's Foil winner:  Lee Kiefer
 Women's Team Foil winners: 
 April 29 – May 1: WC #21 in  Cairo
 Men's Épée winner:  Yannick Borel
 Women's Épée winner:  Choi In-jeong
 May 6 – 8: WC #22 in  Madrid
 Men's Sabre winner:  Oh Sang-uk
 Men's Team Sabre winners: 
 May 6 – 8: WC #23 in  Hammamet
 Women's Sabre winner:  Misaki Emura
 Women's Team Sabre winners: 
 May 12 – 14: WC #24 in  Heidenheim an der Brenz
 Men's Épée winner:  Romain Cannone
 Men's Team Épée winners: 
 May 13 – 15: WC #25 in  Incheon
 Men's Foil winner:  Tommaso Marini
 Women's Foil winner:  Lee Kiefer
 May 20 – 22: WC #26 in  Padua
 Men's Sabre winner:  Áron Szilágyi
 Women's Sabre winner:  Anna Bashta
 May 27 – 29: WC #27 in  Katowice
 Women's Épée winner:  Choi In-jeong
 Women's Team Épée winners: 
 May 27 – 29: WC #28 in  Tbilisi
 Men's Épée winner:  Volodymyr Stankevych
 Men's Team Épée winners:

Field hockey
 October 13, 2021 – June 19: 2021–22 Women's FIH Pro League
 October 16, 2021 – June 30: 2021–22 Men's FIH Pro League
 February 2 – 6: 2022 Men's FIH Indoor Hockey World Cup and 2022 Women's FIH Indoor Hockey World Cup in  Liège
 July 1 – 17: 2022 Women's FIH Hockey World Cup in  Terrassa and  Amstelveen

EHF
 January 14 – 16: 2022 Men's EuroHockey Indoor Championship II in  Paredes
 Winners: , 2nd: , 3rd: , 4th: , 5th: , 6th: , 7th: , 8th: 
 Spain and Poland promoted for 2024 Men's EuroHockey Indoor Championship.
 January 21 – 23: 2022 Women's EuroHockey Indoor Championship II in  Ourense
 Winners: , 2nd: , 3rd: , 4th: , 5th: , 6th: 
 Spain and Belgium promoted for 2024 Women's EuroHockey Indoor Championship.
 TBD: 2022 Men's EuroHockey Indoor Championship III in  Nicosia
 TBD: 2022 Women's EuroHockey Indoor Championship III in  Bratislava
 TBD for December: 2022 Men's EuroHockey Indoor Championship and 2022 Women's EuroHockey Indoor Championship in  Hamburg

AHF
 January 21 – 28: 2022 Women's Hockey Asia Cup in  Muscat
 In the final,  defeated , 4–2, to win their 3rd title.  took third place.
 Japan, South Korea, India and  qualified for 2022 Women's FIH Hockey World Cup.

AHfH
 January 17 – 23: 2022 Men's Hockey Africa Cup of Nations in  Accra
 In the final,  defeated , after penalties, 3–1, to win their 8th title.  took third place.
 South Africa qualified for 2023 Men's FIH Hockey World Cup.
 January 17 – 23: 2022 Women's Hockey Africa Cup of Nations in  Accra
 In the final,  defeated , 3–1, to win their 7th title.  took third place.
 South Africa qualified for 2022 Women's FIH Hockey World Cup.

PAHF
 January 19 – 30: 2022 Men's Pan American Cup and 2022 Women's Pan American Cup in  Santiago
 Men's tournament: In the final,  defeated , 5–1, to win their 5th title.  took third place.
 Argentina and Chile qualified for 2023 Men's FIH Hockey World Cup.
 Women's tournament: In the final,  defeated , 4–2, to win their 6th title.  took third place.
 Argentina, Chile and Canada qualified for 2022 Women's FIH Hockey World Cup.

Figure skating

International figure skating events

2022 Winter Olympics
 February 4 – 20: Figure skating at the 2022 Winter Olympics in  Beijing

2021–22 ISU Figure Skating Championships
 January 10 – 16: European Championships in  Tallinn
 Men's champion:  Mark Kondratiuk
 Women's champion:  Kamila Valieva
 Pairs champions:  Anastasia Mishina / Aleksandr Galliamov
 Ice dance champions:  Victoria Sinitsina / Nikita Katsalapov
 January 18 – 23: Four Continents Championships in  Tallinn
 Men's champion:  Cha Jun-hwan
 Women's champion:  Mai Mihara
 Pairs champions:  Audrey Lu / Misha Mitrofanov
 Ice dance champions:  Caroline Green / Michael Parsons
 March 7 – 13: World Junior Championships in  Tallinn
 March 21 – 27: World Championships in  Montpellier

2021–22 ISU Grand Prix of Figure Skating
 October 22 – 24, 2021: Skate America in  Las Vegas
 Men's champion:  Vincent Zhou
 Women's champion:  Alexandra Trusova
 Pairs champions:  Evgenia Tarasova / Vladimir Morozov
 Ice dance champions:  Madison Hubbell / Zachary Donohue
 October 29 – 31, 2021: Skate Canada in  Vancouver
 Men's champion:  Nathan Chen
 Women's champion:  Kamila Valieva
 Pairs chmpions:  Sui Wenjing / Han Cong
 Ice dance champions:  Piper Gilles / Paul Poirier
 November 5 – 7, 2021: Gran Premio d'Italia in  Turin
 Men's champion:  Yuma Kagiyama
 Women's champion:  Anna Shcherbakova
 Pairs chmpions:  Sui Wenjing / Han Cong
 Ice dance champions:  Gabriella Papadakis / Guillaume Cizeron
 November 12 – 14, 2021: NHK Trophy in  Tokyo
 Men's champion:  Shoma Uno
 Women's champion:  Kaori Sakamoto
 Pairs champions:  Anastasia Mishina / Aleksandr Galliamov
 Ice dance champions:  Victoria Sinitsina / Nikita Katsalapov
 November 19 – 21, 2021: Internationaux de France in  Grenoble
 Men's champion:  Yuma Kagiyama
 Women's champion:  Anna Shcherbakova
 Pairs champions:  Aleksandra Boikova / Dmitrii Kozlovskii
 Ice dance champions:  Gabriella Papadakis / Guillaume Cizeron
 November 26 – 28, 2021: Rostelecom Cup in  Sochi
 Men's champion:  Morisi Kvitelashvili
 Women's champion:  Kamila Valieva
 Pairs champions:  Anastasia Mishina / Aleksandr Galliamov
 Ice dance champions:  Victoria Sinitsina / Nikita Katsalapov
 TBD: Grand Prix Final in TBD

2021–22 ISU Junior Grand Prix
 August 18 – 21, 2021: JGP #1 in  Courchevel
 Junior men's champion:  Ilia Malinin
 Junior women's champion:  Lindsay Thorngren
 No junior pairs event held.
 Junior ice dance champion:  Katarina Wolfkostin / Jeffrey Chen
 August 25 – 28, 2021: JGP #2 in  Courchevel #2
 Junior men's champion:  Wesley Chiu
 Junior women's champion:  Isabeau Levito
 No junior pairs event held.
 Junior ice dance champion:  Oona Brown / Gage Brown
 September 1 – 4, 2021: JGP #3 in  Košice
 Junior men's champion:  Kirill Sarnovskiy
 Junior women's champion:  Veronika Zhilina
 Junior pairs champion:  Anastasia Mukhortova / Dmitry Evgenyev
 Junior ice dance champion:  Natalie D'Alessandro / Bruce Waddell
 September 15 – 18, 2021: JGP #4 in  Krasnoyarsk
 Junior men's champion:  Gleb Lutfullin
 Junior women's champion:  Sofia Akateva
 Junior pairs champion:  Ekaterina Chikmareva / Matvei Ianchenkov
 Junior ice dance champion:  Irina Khavronina / Dario Cirisano
 September 22 – 25, 2021: JGP #5 in  Ljubljana
 Junior men's champion:  Ilya Yablokov
 Junior women's champion:  Adeliia Petrosian
 No junior pairs event held.
 Junior ice dance champion:  Vasilisa Kaganovskaia / Valeriy Angelopol
 September 29 – October 2, 2021: JGP #6 in  Gdańsk
 Junior men's champion:  Gleb Lutfullin
 Junior women's champion:  Sofia Akateva
 Junior pairs champion:  Ekaterina Chikmareva / Matvei Ianchenkov
 Junior ice dance champion:  Irina Khavronina / Dario Cirisano
 October 6 – 9, 2021: JGP #7 in  Linz
 Junior men's champion:  Ilia Malinin
 Junior women's champion:  Sofia Muravieva
 Junior pairs champion:  Natalia Khabibullina / Ilya Knyazhuk
 Junior ice dance champion:  Sofya Tyutyunina / Alexander Shustitskiy
 TBD: JGP Final in TBD

2021–22 ISU Challenger Series
 September 10 – 12, 2021: Lombardia Trophy in  Bergamo
 Men's champion:  Daniel Grassl
 Women's champion:  Alysa Liu
 Pairs not included as part of Challenger event.
 Ice dance champion:  Charlène Guignard / Marco Fabbri
 September 16 – 18, 2021: Autumn Classic in  Pierrefonds
 Men's not included as part of Challenger event.
 Women's champion:  Marilena Kitromilis
 Pairs champion:  Riku Miura / Ryuichi Kihara
 Ice dance champion:  Piper Gilles / Paul Poirier
 September 22 – 25, 2021: Nebelhorn Trophy in  Oberstdorf
 Men's champion:  Vincent Zhou
 Women's champion:  Alysa Liu
 Pairs champion:  Minerva Fabienne Hase / Nolan Seegert
 Ice dance champion:  Juulia Turkkila / Matthias Versluis
 Sept. 30 – Oct. 2, 2021: Nepela Memorial in  Bratislava
 October 7 – 10, 2021: Finlandia Trophy in  Espoo
 Men's champion:  Jason Brown
 Women's champion:  Kamila Valieva
 Pairs champion:  Anastasia Mishina / Aleksandr Galliamov
 Ice dance champion:  Gabriella Papadakis / Guillaume Cizeron
 October 13 – 17, 2021: Asian Open Trophy in  Beijing
 Did not meet minimum entry requirements for Challenger events.
 October 28 – 31, 2021: Denis Ten Memorial Challenge in  Nur-Sultan
 Men's champion:  Petr Gumennik
 Women's champion:  Viktoriia Safonova
 Pairs not included as part of Challenger event.
 Ice dance champion:  Anastasia Skoptsova / Kirill Aleshin
 November 11 – 14, 2021: Cup of Austria in  Graz
 Men's champion:  Nika Egadze
 Women's champion:  Wakaba Higuchi
 Pairs not included as part of Challenger event.
 Ice dance champion:  Charlène Guignard / Marco Fabbri
 November 18 – 21, 2021: Warsaw Cup in  Warsaw
 Men's champion:  Sōta Yamamoto
 Women's champion:  Maiia Khromykh
 Pairs champion:  Evgenia Tarasova / Vladimir Morozov
 Ice dance champion:  Diana Davis / Gleb Smolkin
 December 8 – 11, 2021: Golden Spin of Zagreb in  Sisak
 Men's champion:  Keegan Messing
 Women's champion:  Anastasia Gubanova
 Pairs champion:  Audrey Lu / Misha Mitrofanov
 Ice dance champion:  Kaitlin Hawayek / Jean-Luc Baker

National figure skating events

Fistball

EFA
 January 7 – 8: EFA 2022 Women's Champions Cup in  Calw
 In the final,  TSV Dennach def.  TSV Calw, 4–2 (15–13, 11–9, 11–9, 9–11, 11–13, 11–5).  SVD Diepoldsau-Schmitter took third place.
 January 8 – 9: EFA 2022 Men's Champions Cup in  Pfungstadt
 In the final,  TSV Pfungstadt def.  Union Tigers Vöcklabruck, 4–0 (11–9, 11–9, 11–7, 11–6).  TV Käfertal took third place.
 June 10 – 12: 2020 Men's Fistball European Championships in  Caldaro
 July 29 – 30: EFA 2022 Fistball U21 Men's European Championship in  Vaihingen an der Enz
 July 30 – 31: EFA 2022 Fistball U18 European Championships in  Vaihingen an der Enz
 October 1 – 2: 2022 European Youth Cup in  Kellinghusen

Floorball
 Champions Cup – cancelled
 July 2022: Floorball at the 2022 World Games in 
 Champion: 
 August 31 – September 4: 2022 Women's under-19 World Floorball Championships in 
 Champion: 
 November 5 – 13: 2022 Men's World Floorball Championships in 
 Champion:

Flying disc
 June 25 – July 2: 2022 World Masters Ultimate Club Championships in  Limerick
 July 23 – 30: 2022 World Ultimate Club Championships in  Lebanon
 August 1 – 6: 2022 World Overall Flying Disc Championships in  San Diego
 August 6 – 13: 2022 World Junior Ultimate Championships in  Punta Cana
 August 17 – 20: 2022 World Team Disc Golf Championships in  Varaždin

Freestyle skiing

Futsal

UEFA
 January 19 – February 6: UEFA Futsal Euro 2022 in 
 March 24 – 27: UEFA Women's Futsal Euro 2022 (final four in  Gondomar)
 April 30 – May 1: 2021–22 UEFA Futsal Champions League (final four in  Riga)
 September 3 – 10: 2022 UEFA Under-19 Futsal Championship in  Jaén

CONMEBOL
 January 29 – February 6: 2022 Copa América de Futsal in  Rio de Janeiro
 April 30 – May 7: 2022 Copa Libertadores de Futsal in 
 June 4 – 11: 2022 Copa Libertadores de Futsal Femenino in

AFC
 September 25 – October 20: 2022 AFC Futsal Asian Cup in

Golf

 August 24 – 27: 2022 Espirito Santo Trophy in 
 August 31 – September 3: 2022 Eisenhower Trophy in

2021–22 PGA Tour

Gymnastics

 March 10 – 13: 2022 Acrobatic Gymnastics World Championships in  Baku
 June 1 – 5: 2022 European Trampoline Championships in  Rimini
 June 15 – 19: 2022 Rhythmic Gymnastics European Championships in  Tel Aviv
 June 16 – 18: 2022 Aerobic Gymnastics World Championships in  Guimarães
 August 11 – 21: 2022 European Women's Artistic Gymnastics Championships and 2022 European Men's Artistic Gymnastics Championships in  Munich
 September 14 – 17: 2022 European Championships in TeamGym in  Luxemburg City
 September 14 – 19: 2022 Rhythmic Gymnastics World Championships in  Sofia
 October 29 – November 6: 2022 World Artistic Gymnastics Championships in  Liverpool
 November 16 – 19: 2022 Trampoline Gymnastics World Championships in  Sofia

2022 FIG Artistic Gymnastics World Cup series
World Cup series
 February 24 – 27: WC #1 in  Cottbus
 March 2 – 5: WC #2 in  Doha
 March 13 – 20: WC #3 in  Cairo
 March 31 – April 4: WC #4 in  Baku (final)

World Challenge Cup series
 May 26 – 29: WCC #1 in  Varna
 June 9 – 12: WCC #2 in  Osijek
 June 16 – 19: WCC #3 in  Koper
 September 24 & 25: WCC #4 in  Paris
 September 30 – October 2: WCC #5 in  Szombathely
 October 7 – 9: WCC #6 in  Mersin (final)

2022 FIG Acrobatic Gymnastics World Cup series
 May 13 – 15: WC #1 in  Maia
 Men's Pair winners:  Angel Felix & Braiden McDougall 
 Women's Pair winners:  Viktoria Kozlovska & Taisia Marchenko
 Mixed Pair winners:  Helena Heijens & Bram Roettger
 Men's Group winners:  Bradley Gold, Archie Goonesekera, Finlay Gray, Andrew Morris-Hunt
 Women's Group winners:  Kim Bergmans, Lise De Meyst, Bo Hollebosch
 June 3 – 5: WC #2 in  Rzeszów

2022 FIG Tumbling and Trampoline Gymnastics World Cup series
 February 12 & 13: WC #1 in  Baku
 Trampoline winners:  Ivan Litvinovich (m) /  Irina Kundius (f)
 Trampoline Synchro winners:  (Andrei Builou & Ivan Litvinovich) (m) /  (Sıla Karakuş & Livanur Yalçın) (f)
 May 27 & 28: WC #2 in  Rimini
 June 25 & 26: WC #3 in  Coimbra
 July 1 & 2: WC #4 in  Arosa
 September 23 & 24: WC #5 in  Saint Petersburg

2022 FIG Rhythmic Gymnastics World Cup series
 March 18 – 20: WC #1 in  Athens
 April 8 – 10: WC #2 in  Sofia
 April 15 – 17: WC #3 in  Tashkent
 April 22 – 24: WC #4 in  Baku
 June 3 – 5: WC #5 in  Pesaro

World Challenge Cup series
 May 20 – 22: WCC #1 in  Pamplona
 May 27 – 29: WCC #2 in  Portimão
 August 19 – 21: WCC #3 in  Moscow
 August 26 – 28: WCC #4 in  Cluj-Napoca
 September 2 – 4: WCC #5 in  Minsk

2022 FIG Aerobic Gymnastics World series
 March 25 – 27: WC #1 in  Cantanhede
 Individual winners:  Miquel Mañé (m) /  Tamires Silva
 Mixed Pairs winners:  Dániel Bali & Fanni Mazacs
 Trio winners:  Dániel Bali, Balázs Farkas & Fanni Mazacs
 Group winners: 
 April 23 & 24: WC #2 in  Tokyo
 May 13 & 14: WC #3 in  Maia

Handball

IHF
 June 22 – July 3: 2022 Women's Junior World Handball Championship in 
 August 3 – 14: 2022 IHF Women's Youth World Championship in 
 October 17 – 23: 2022 IHF Men's Super Globe in

AHF
 January 18 – 31: 2022 Asian Men's Handball Championship in  Dammam
 In the final,  defeated , 29–24, to win their 5th title.  took third place.
 Qatar, Bahrain, Saudi Arabia,  and  qualified for the 2023 World Men's Handball Championship.
 February 12 – 21: 2022 Asian Women's Junior Handball Championship in  Tashkent
 February 25 – March 7: 2021 Asian Women's Youth Handball Championship in  Almaty
 June 18 – 27: 2020 Asian Club League Handball Championship in  Doha
 July 16 – 25: 2022 Asian Men's Youth Handball Championship in TBD
 August 13 – 22: 2022 Asian Men's Junior Handball Championship in TBD

EHF
 In the final,  defeated , 27–26, to win their 5th title.  took third place.
 Sweden along with Spain, Denmark qualified for the 2023 World Men's Handball Championship and for the 2024 European Men's Handball Championship.
  and  qualified for the 2023 World Men's Handball Championship.

Club competitions
 September 15, 2021 – June 19: 2021–22 EHF Champions League (final four in  Cologne)
 September 11, 2021 – June 5: 2021–22 Women's EHF Champions League (final four in  Budapest)
 August 28, 2021 – May 29: 2021–22 EHF European League
 October 16, 2021 – May 15: 2021–22 Women's EHF European League
 September 11, 2021 – May 29: 2021–22 EHF European Cup
 October 14, 2021 – ?: 2021–22 Women's EHF European Cup

Regional club competitions
 September 4, 2021 – ?: 2021–22 Baltic Handball League
 September 14, 2021 – ?: 2021–22 BENE-League Handball
 September 4, 2021 – ?: 2021–22 Women Handball International League

SCAHC
 January 25 – 29: 2022 South and Central American Men's Handball Championship in  Recife
 In the final,  defeated , 20–17, to win their 1st title.  took third place.
 Brazil, Argentina, Chile along  qualified for the 2023 World Men's Handball Championship.

Horse racing

United States
US Triple Crown
 
 May 7: Kentucky Derby at  Churchill Downs
 May 21: Preakness Stakes at  Pimlico 
 June 11: Belmont Stakes at  Belmont Park

Breeders Cup
Nov 4–5: Breeders Cup at  Keenland

Hong Kong
Hong Kong Triple Crown
 January 23: Hong Kong Stewards' Cup in 
 Winner:  Zac Purton
 February 20: Hong Kong Gold Cup in 
 May 22: Hong Kong Champions & Chater Cup in

Ice climbing

 January 26–29: 2022 UIAA Ice Climbing World Championships in  Saas-Fee
 Lead winners:  Louna Ladevant (m) /  Petra Klingler (f)
 Speed winners:  Mohsen Beheshti Rad (m) /  Natalia Savitskaia (f)
 January 26–29: 2022 UIAA Ice Climbing World Youth Championships in  Saas-Fee
 Lead U16 winners:  Landers Gaydosh (m) /  Arina Kolegova (f)
 Speed U16 winners:  Roman Shubin (m) /  Arina Kolegova (f)
 Lead U19 winners:  Keenan Griscom (m) /  Polina Bratukhina (f)
 Speed U19 winners:  Danila Naumov (m) /  Anna Altsibeeva (f)
 Lead U21 winners:  Ivan Loshchenko (m) /  Iuliia Filateva (f)
 Speed U21 winners:  Nikita Glazyrin (m) /  Iuliia Filateva (f)
 February 4–6: 2022 UIAA Ice Climbing North American Championships in  Ouray
 February 4–6: 2022 UIAA Ice Climbing North American Youth Championships in  Ouray
 February 18–20: 2022 UIAA Ice Climbing European Championships in  Oulu
 February 18–20: 2022 UIAA Ice Climbing European Youth Championships in  Oulu

2022 UIAA Ice Climbing World Cup
 February 25–27: WC #1 in  Cheongsong
 Cancelled
 March 4–6: WC #2 in  Tyumen
 Cancelled
 March 11–13: WC #3 in  Kirov (final)
 Cancelled

2021–2022 UIAA Ice Climbing European Cup
 November 13, 2021: EC #1 in  Bern
 Lead winners:  Nikolay Primerov (m) /  Sina Goetz (f)
 November 27, 2021: EC #2 in  Žilina
 Lead winners:  David Bouffard (m) /  Olga Kosek (f)
 December 4, 2021: EC #3 in  Brno
 Lead winners:  Virgile Devin (m) /  Enni Bertling (f)
 December 11, 2021: EC #4 in  Utrecht
 Lead winners:  Virgile Devin (m) /  Marianne van der Steen (f)
 December 11, 2021: EC #4 in  Utrecht
 Lead winners:  Virgile Devin (m) /  Marianne van der Steen (f)
 January 22: EC #5 in  Malbun
 Lead winners:  Louna Ladevant (m) /  Sina Goetz (f)
 February 18–20: EC #6 in  Oulu (final)

Ice hockey

Ice Hockey World Championships
 March 3 – 9: 2022 IIHF World Championship Division IV in  Bishkek
 Final placements: : , : , : , 4th: , 5th: 
 Kyrgyzstan, Iran, Sinagpore and Malaysia promoted to Division III B for 2023.
 March 21 – April 9: 2022 IIHF World Championship Division III in  Kockelscheuer and  Cape Town
 Group A final placements: : , : , : , 4th: , 5th: 
 United Arab Emirates and Turkey promoted to Division II B for 2023.
 Group B final placements: : , : , : 
 South Africa and Thailand promoted to Division III A for 2023.
 April 18 – 30: 2022 IIHF World Championship Division II in  Reykjavík and  Zagreb
 Group A final placements: : , : , : , 4th: , 5th: 
 China promoted to Division I B for 2023.
 Group B final placements: : , : , : , 4th: , 5th: 
 Iceland promoted to Division II A for 2023.
 April 25 – May 8: 2022 IIHF World Championship Division I in  Ljubljana and  Tychy
 Group A final placements: : , : , : , 4th: , 5th: 
 Slovenia and Hungary promoted to Top Division for 2023.
 Group B final placements: : , : , : , 4th: , 5th: 
 Poland promoted to Division I A for 2023.
 May 13 – 29: 2022 IIHF World Championship in  Tampere and Helsinki
 Final placements: : , : , : , 4th: 
 Italy and Great Britain relegated to Division I A for 2023.

IIHF World Women's Championship
 March 22 – April 9: 2022 IIHF Women's World Championship Division III in  Sofia and  Belgrade
 Group A final placements: : , : , : 
 Belgium promoted to Division II B for 2023.
 Group B final placements: : , : , : , 4th: 
 Estonia promoted to Division III A for 2023.
 April 3 – May 23: 2022 IIHF Women's World Championship Division II in  Jaca and  Zagreb
 Group A final placements: : , : , : , 4th: , 5th: 
 Great Britain promoted to Division I B for 2023.
 Group B final placements: : , : , : , 4th: , 5th: 
 Iceland promoted to Division II A for 2023.
 April 8 – 30: 2022 IIHF Women's World Championship Division I in  Katowice and  Angers
 Group A final placements: : , : , : , 4th: , 5th: 
 France promoted to Top Division for 2023.
 Group B final placements: : , : , : , 4th: , 5th: , 6th: 
 China promoted to Division I A for 2023.
 August 26 – September 4: 2022 IIHF Women's World Championship in  Herning and Frederikshavn
 Final placements: : , : , : , 4th: 
 Denmark relegated to Division I for 2023.

IIHF World Junior Championship
 December 26, 2021 – January 5: 2022 World Junior Ice Hockey Championships in  Edmonton and Red Deer, rescheduled to August 9 – 20, 2022.
 On December 29, 2021, the IIHF Council cancelled the remainder of the tournament due to the ongoing COVID-19 pandemic and spread of the Omicron variant.
 December 12 – 18, 2021: 2022 World Junior Ice Hockey Championships – Division I in  Hørsholm (Group A) and  Tallinn (Group B)
 Group A final placements: : , : , : , 4th: , 5th: , Suspended: 
 Latvia promoted to Top Division for 2022 and 2023.
 Note:  placed 1st in Group A but was suspended from IIHF competitions. Runner-ups  therefore got promoted to 1st.
 Group B final placements: : , : , : , 4th: , 5th: , 6th: 
 France and Slovenia promoted to Division I A for 2023
 December 13 – 19, 2021 and January 10 – 16: 2022 World Junior Ice Hockey Championships – Division II in  Brașov (Group A) and  Belgrade (Group B)
 Group A final placements: : , : , : , 4th: , 5th: , 6th: 
 Italy and South Korea promoted to Division I B for 2023.
 Group B final placements: : , : , : , 4th: , 5th: 
 Croatia and Netherlands promoted to Division II A for 2023.
 January 6 – 16: 2022 World Junior Ice Hockey Championships – Division III in  Queretaro, rescheduled to July 22 – 30, 2022.
On December 24, 2021, the tournament was cancelled due to the ongoing COVID-19 pandemic and spread of the Omicron variant.
 July 22 – 30: 2022 World Junior Ice Hockey Championships – Division III in  Queretaro 
 Final placements: : , : , : , 4th: 
 Chinese Taipei and Mexico promoted to Division II B for 2023.
 August 9 – 20: 2022 World Junior Ice Hockey Championships in  Edmonton and Red Deer
 Final placements: : , : , : , 4th:

National Hockey League
October 12 – April 30: 2021–22 NHL season
 Presidents' Trophy and Eastern Conference winners:  Florida Panthers
 Western Conference winners:  Colorado Avalanche
 Art Ross Trophy winner:  Connor McDavid ( Edmonton Oilers)
 January 1: 2022 NHL Winter Classic at the Target Field in  Minneapolis
 The  St. Louis Blues defeated the  Minnesota Wild, 6–4.
February 5: 2022 National Hockey League All-Star Game in  Las Vegas
May 2 – June 26: 2022 NHL Playoffs
 The  Colorado Avalanche def. the  Tampa Bay Lightning, 4–2 in games played, to win their third Stanley Cup championship.
July 7 – 8: 2022 NHL Entry Draft in  Montreal
#1:  Juraj Slafkovský (to the  Montreal Canadiens from  TPS)

Champions Hockey League
 August 26, 2021 – March 1: 2021–22 Champions Hockey League

IIHF Continental Cup
 September 24, 2021 – March 6: 2021–22 IIHF Continental Cup

Kontinental Hockey League
 September 1, 2021 – April 30: 2021–22 KHL season

Euro Hockey Tour
 November 10, 2021 – May 8: 2021–22 Euro Hockey Tour in  Helsinki,  Prague,  Moscow

Hockey Europe
 September 11, 2021 –: // 2021–22 Alps Hockey League
 September 16, 2021 –: ///// 2021–22 ICE Hockey League season
 October 2, 2021 –: / 2021–22 BeNe League

Ice stock sport
 February 16 – 27: 2022 Icestocksport World Championships in  Klobenstein

Judo
 August 7 – 14: 2022 World Judo Championships in  Tashkent

Judo World Tour
 January 28 – 30:  2022 Judo Grand Prix Almada
 Extra-lightweight winners:  Lee Ha-rim (m) /  Catarina Costa (f)
 Half-lightweight winners:  Denis Vieru (m) /  Distria Krasniqi (f)
 Lightweight winners:  Murodjon Yuldoshev (m) /  Rafaela Silva (f)
 Half-middleweight winners:  Matthias Casse (m) /  Joanne van Lieshout (f)
 Middleweight winners:  Jesper Smink (m) /  Lara Cvjetko (f)
 Half-heavyweight winners:  Jorge Fonseca (m) /  Yoon Hyun-ji (f)
 Heavyweight winners:  Kim Min-jong (m) /  Kim Ha-yun (f)
 February 5 & 6:  2022 Judo Grand Slam Paris
 Extra-lightweight winners:  Ryuju Nagayama (m) /  Natsumi Tsunoda (f)
 Half-lightweight winners:  Yondonperenlein Baskhüü (m) /  Amandine Buchard (f)
 Lightweight winners:  Lasha Shavdatuashvili (m) /  Haruka Funakubo (f)
 Half-middleweight winners:  Sotaro Fujiwara (m) /  Nami Nabekura (f)
 Middleweight winners:  Sanshiro Murao (m) /  Margaux Pinot (f)
 Half-heavyweight winners:  Toma Nikiforov (m) /  Audrey Tcheuméo (f)
 Heavyweight winners:  Odkhüügiin Tsetsentsengel (m) /  Wakaba Tomita (f)
 February 17 – 19:  2022 Judo Grand Slam Tel Aviv
 Extra-lightweight winners:  Artem Lesiuk (m) /  Shirine Boukli (f)
 Half-lightweight winners:  Baruch Shmailov (m) /  Astride Gneto (f)
 Lightweight winners:  Hidayet Heydarov (m) /  Priscilla Gneto (f)
 Half-middleweight winners:  Matthias Casse (m) /  Megumi Horikawa (f)
 Middleweight winners:  Mammadali Mehdiyev (m) /  Shiho Tanaka (f)
 Half-heavyweight winners:  Ilia Sulamanidze (m) /  Beata Pacut (f)
 Heavyweight winners:  Guram Tushishvili (m) /  Romane Dicko (f)
 April 1 – 3:  2022 Judo Grand Slam Antalya
 Extra-lightweight winners:  Yang Yung-wei (m) /  Ganbaataryn Narantsetseg (f)
 Half-lightweight winners:  Denis Vieru (m) /  Réka Pupp (f)
 Lightweight winners:  Giorgi Terashvili (m) /  Jessica Klimkait (f)
 Half-middleweight winners:  Guilherme Schimidt (m) /  Lucy Renshall (f)
 Middleweight winners:  Iván Felipe Silva Morales (m) /  Marie-Ève Gahié (f)
 Half-heavyweight winners:  Jorge Fonseca (m) /  Anna-Maria Wagner (f)
 Heavyweight winners:  Guram Tushishvili (m) /  Léa Fontaine (f)
 June 3 – 5:  2022 Judo Grand Slam Tbilisi

Judo Senior European Cup
 March 19 & 20: Senior European Cup #1 in  Riga
 April 23 & 24: Senior European Cup #2 in  Dubrovnik

Judo European Cup
 February 11 – 13: European Cup #1 in  Sarajevo
 Extra-lightweight winners:  Turan Bayramov (m) /  Gülkader Şentürk (f)
 Half-lightweight winners:  Ejder Toktay (m) /  Binta Ndiaye (f)
 Lightweight winners:  Michel Adam (m) /  Carla Ubasart Mascaró (f)
 Half-middleweight winners:  Arnaud Aregba (m) /  Sarai Padilla (f)
 Middleweight winners:  Martin Matijass (m) /  Lara Cvjetko (f)
 Half-heavyweight winners:  Enrico Bergamelli (m) /  Loriana Kuka (f)
 Heavyweight winners:  Vito Dragič (m) /  Valentine Marchand (f)
 February 26 & 27: European Cup #2 in  Warsaw

Judo European Open
 March 5 & 6: European Open #1 in  Prague

Judo African Open
 March 12 & 13: African Open #1 in  Tunis
 March 19 & 20: African Open #2 in  Algiers

Karate
 May 25 – 29: 2022 European Karate Championships in  Gaziantep
 May 26 – 28: 2022 Pan American Karate Championships in 
 June 4 – 5: 2022 Oceania Karate Championships in

2022 Karate1 Premier League
 February 18 – 20: #1 in  Fujairah
 Kata winners:  Enes Özdemir (m) /  Kiyou Shimizu (f)
 Men's −60 kg winner:  Abdullah Hammad
 Men's −67 kg winner:  Didar Amirali
 Men's −75 kg winner:  Abdalla Abdelaziz
 Men's −84 kg winner:  Youssef Badawy
 Men's +84 kg winner:  Hazeem Mohamed
 Women's −50 kg winner:  Moldir Zhangbyrbay
 Women's −55 kg winner:  Anna Chernysheva
 Women's −61 kg winner:  Alessandra Mangiacapra
 Women's −68 kg winner:  Irina Zaretska
 Women's +68 kg winner:  Nancy Garcia
 April 22 – 24: #2 in  Matosinhos
 Kata winners:  Kakeru Nishiyama (m) /  Kiyou Shimizu (f)
 Men's −60 kg winner:  Christos-Stefanos Xenos
 Men's −67 kg winner:  Steven Da Costa
 Men's −75 kg winner:  Daniele De Vivo
 Men's −84 kg winner:  Brian Timmermans
 Men's +84 kg winner:  Babacar Seck
 Women's −50 kg winner:  Yorgelis Salazar
 Women's −55 kg winner:  Anzhelika Terliuga
 Women's −61 kg winner:  Anita Serogina
 Women's −68 kg winner:  Silvia Semeraro
 Women's +68 kg winner:  Lucija Lesjak
 May 13 – 15: #3 in  Rabat
 Kata winners:  Kazumasa Moto (m) /  Hikaru Ono (f)
 Men's −60 kg winner:  Abdel Ali Jina
 Men's −67 kg winner:  Dionysios Xenos
 Men's −75 kg winner:  Abdalla Abdelaziz
 Men's −84 kg winner:  Youssef Badawy
 Men's +84 kg winner:  Taha Tarek Mahmoud
 Women's −50 kg winner:  Reem Ahmed Salama
 Women's −55 kg winner:  Anzhelika Terliuga
 Women's −61 kg winner:  Dahab Ali
 Women's −68 kg winner:  Elena Quirici
 Women's +68 kg winner:  Ayumi Uekusa
 September 2 – 4: #4 in  Baku

2022 Karate1 Series A
 January 28 – 30: #1 in  Pamplona
 Kata winners:  Ryuji Moto (m) /  Gema Morales (f)
 Kata Team winners:  (Mohammad Hussain, Sayed Salman Al-Mosawi, Mohammad Al-Mosawi) (m) /  (Raquel Roy Rubio, María López Pintado, Lidia Rodríguez Encabo) (f)
 Men's −60 kg winner:  Danilo Greco
 Men's −67 kg winner:  Ernest Sharafutdinov
 Men's −75 kg winner:  Kilian Cizo
 Men's −84 kg winner:  Dany Makamata
 Men's +84 kg winner:  Ondřej Bosák
 Women's −50 kg winner:  Valéria Kumizaki
 Women's −55 kg winner:  Mia Bitsch
 Women's −61 kg winner:  Elena Quirici
 Women's −68 kg winner:  Lynn Snel
 Women's +68 kg winner:  Tatiana Zyabkina
 June 10 – 12: #2 in  Cairo
 September 23 – 25: #3 in  Temuco
 November 11 – 13: #4 in  TBD

Kickboxing

International competitions
 September 16–25: WAKO Children, Cadet and Junior World Championship in  Dublin
 November 11–20: WAKO Senior and Master European Championship in  Antalya

2022 WAKO World Cup
 March 3–6: WC #1 in  Dublin
 May 5–8: WC #2 in  Istanbul
 May 26–29: WC #3 in  Innsbruck
 Cancelled
 June 1–5: WC #4 in  Budapest
 June 16–19: WC #5 in  Rimini

2022 WAKO European Cup
 January 21–23: EC #1 in  Lignano Sabbiadoro
 Cancelled
 February 11–13: EC #2 in  Karlovac
 March 18–20: EC #3 in  Belgrade

Korfball
 January 28 – 30: 2022 IKF Europa Shield in  Prostějov
 Event cancelled due Covid-19 situation in Europe.
 February 10 – 12: 2022 IKF Europa Cup in  Papendrecht
 April 15 – 17: 2022 IKF U19 World Korfball Championship in  Kutná Hora
 July 2 – 3: 2022 U17 Korfball World Cup in  Eindhoven
 August 19 & 20: 2022 World Beach Korfball Championship in  Nador

Lacrosse
 June 29 – July 9: 2022 World Lacrosse Women's World Championship in  Towson

National Lacrosse League
 December 3, 2021 — June 18, 2022: 2022 NLL season
 MVP: Dhane Smith
 NLL Cup: Colorado Mammoth

Lifesaving
 September 25 – October 2: 2022 Lifesaving World Championships in  Riccione

Luge
 January 15 & 16: 2022 FIL Junior European Luge Championships in  Bludenz
 Men's singles winner:  Marián Skupek
 Women's singles winner:  Melina Fischer
 Men's doubles winners:  Moritz Jäger & Valentin Steudte
 Women's doubles winners:  Viktorija Ziediņa & Selina Zvilna
 Team relay winners:  (Melina Fischer, Timon Grancagnolo, Moritz Jäger & Valentin Steudte)
 January 22 & 23: 2022 FIL European Luge Championships at the  St. Moritz-Celerina Olympic Bobrun
 Men's singles winner:  Wolfgang Kindl
 Women's singles winner:  Natalie Geisenberger
 Men's doubles winners:  Toni Eggert & Sascha Benecken
 Team Relay winners:  (Elīna Ieva Vītola, Kristers Aparjods, Mārtiņš Bots & Roberts Plūme)
 January 22 & 23: 2022 FIL U23 European Luge Championships at the  St. Moritz-Celerina Olympic Bobrun
 Men's U23 singles winner:  Leon Felderer
 Women's U23 singles winner:  Elīna Ieva Vītola
 Men's U23 doubles winners:  Mārtiņš Bots & Roberts Plūme
 January 28 & 29: 2022 FIL Junior World Championships in  Winterberg
 Men's singles winner:  Matvei Perestoronin
 Women's singles winner:  Jessica Degenhardt
 Men's doubles winners:  Eduards Ševics-Mikeļševics & Lūkass Krasts
 Women's doubles winners:  Luisa Romanenko & Pauline Patz
 Team Relay winners:  (Jessica Degenhardt, Florian Müller, Moritz Jäger & Valentin Steudte)
 February 4 – 6: 2022 FIL Junior World Luge Natural Track Championships in  Jaufental
 February 10 – 13: FIL European Luge Natural Track Championships 2022 in  Laas

2021–22 Luge World Cup
 November 20 & 21, 2021: WC #1 in  Yanqing
 Men's singles winner:  Johannes Ludwig
 Women's singles winner:  Madeleine Egle
 Doubles winners:  Toni Eggert & Sascha Benecken
 Team relay winners:  (Madeleine Egle, David Gleirscher, Thomas Steu & Lorenz Koller)
 November 27 & 28, 2021: WC #2 in  Sochi
 Men's singles winner:  Johannes Ludwig
 Women's singles winner:  Anna Berreiter
 Doubles winners:  Andris Šics & Juris Šics
 Team relay winners:  (Victoria Demchenko, Semen Pavlichenko, Andrei Bogdanov & Yuri Prokhorov)
 December 4 & 5, 2021: WC #3 in  Sochi
 Men's singles winner:  Kristers Aparjods
 Women's singles winner:  Julia Taubitz
 Doubles winners:  Andrei Bogdanov & Yuri Prokhorov
 December 11 & 12, 2021: WC #4 in  Altenberg
 Men's singles winners:  Wolfgang Kindl &  Max Langenhan (same time)
 Women's singles winner:  Madeleine Egle
 Doubles winners:  Thomas Steu & Lorenz Koller
 Team relay winners:  (Julia Taubitz, Max Langenhan, Toni Eggert & Sascha Benecken)
 December 18 & 19, 2021: WC #5 in  Innsbruck
 Men's singles winner:  Johannes Ludwig
 Women's singles winner:  Julia Taubitz
 Doubles winners:  Thomas Steu & Lorenz Koller
 January 1 & 2: WC #6 in  Winterberg
 Men's singles winner:  Johannes Ludwig
 Women's singles winner:  Julia Taubitz
 Doubles winners:  Tobias Wendl & Tobias Arlt
 Team relay winners:  (Elīza Tīruma, Kristers Aparjods, Mārtiņš Bots & Roberts Plūme)
 January 8 & 9: WC #7 in  Sigulda
 Men's singles winner:  Kristers Aparjods
 Doubles winners:  Toni Eggert & Sascha Benecken
 Women's singles winner:  Madeleine Egle
 January 15 & 16: WC #8 in  Oberhof
 Men's singles winner:  Johannes Ludwig
 Doubles winners:  Toni Eggert & Sascha Benecken
 Women's singles winner:  Madeleine Egle
 Team relay winners:  (Julia Taubitz, Johannes Ludwig, Toni Eggert & Sascha Benecken)
 January 22 & 23: WC #9 in  St. Moritz
 Doubles winners:  Toni Eggert & Sascha Benecken
 Men's singles winner:  Wolfgang Kindl
 Women's singles winner:  Natalie Geisenberger
 Team relay winners:  (Elīna leva Vītola, Kristers Aparjods, Mārtiņš Bots & Roberts Plūme)
 Doubles World Cup winners:  Toni Eggert & Sascha Benecken
 Men's singles World Cup winner:  Johannes Ludwig
 Women's singles World Cup winner:  Julia Taubitz
 Team relay World Cup winners:

2021–22 Sprint World Cup
 December 4 & 5, 2021: WC #1 in  Sochi
 Men's singles winner:  Dominik Fischnaller
 Women's singles winner:  Julia Taubitz
 Doubles winners:  Andris Šics & Juris Šics
 December 18 & 19, 2021: WC #2 in  Innsbruck
 Men's singles winner:  Wolfgang Kindl
 Women's singles winner:  Madeleine Egle
 Doubles winners:  Toni Eggert & Sascha Benecken
 January 8 & 9: WC #3 in  Sigulda
 Men's singles winner:  Felix Loch
 Women's singles winner:  Tatiana Ivanova
 Doubles winners:  Andris Šics & Juris Šics

2021–22 Natural Track Luge World Cup
 January 8 & 9: WC #1 in  Umhausen
 Men's singles winner:  Thomas Kammerlander
 Women's singles winner:  Evelin Lanthaler
 Doubles winners:  Patrick Pigneter & Florian Clara
 Team winners:  (Evelin Lanthaler & Alex Gruber)
 January 15 & 16: WC #2 in  Umhausen
 Men's singles winner:  Alex Gruber
 Women's singles winner:  Evelin Lanthaler
 Doubles winners:  Patrick Pigneter & Florian Clara
 January 22 & 23: WC #3 in  Vatra Dornei
 Men's singles winner:  Thomas Kammerlander
 Women's singles winner:  Evelin Lanthaler
 Doubles winners:  Patrick Pigneter & Florian Clara
 January 29 & 30: WC #4 in  Deutschnofen
 Men's singles winner:  Alex Gruber
 Women's singles winner:  Evelin Lanthaler
 Doubles winners:  Patrick Pigneter & Florian Clara
 Team winners:  (Evelin Lanthaler & Alex Gruber)
 February 19 & 20: WC #5 in  Mariazell
 Men's singles winner:  Michael Scheikl
 Women's singles winner:  Evelin Lanthaler
 Doubles winners:  Patrick Pigneter & Florian Clara
 Men's singles World Cup winner:  Alex Gruber
 Women's singles World Cup winner:  Evelin Lanthaler
 Doubles World Cup winners:  Patrick Pigneter & Florian Clara

Minigolf
 August 10 – 13: 2022 World Minigolf Championships in  Wanne-Eickel

Modern pentathlon

2022 Modern Pentathlon World Cup
 March 22 – 27: #1 in  Cairo
 Winners:  Christopher Patte (m) /  Elena Micheli (f)
 Mixed Relay winners:  Salma Abdelmaksoud & Mohanad Shaban
 April 25 – May 1: #2 in  Budapest
 Winners:  Martin Vlach (m) /  Michelle Gulyás (f)
 Mixed Relay winners:  Noureldin Karim & Haydy Morsy
 May 10 – 15: #3 in  Albena
 Winners:  Jun Woong-tae (m) /  Ieva Serapinaitė (f)
 Mixed Relay winners:  Emiliano Hernández & Tamara Vega

Motorsports

2022 Formula One World Championship
 March 20:  2022 Bahrain Grand Prix
 Winner:  Charles Leclerc (Ferrari)
 March 27:  2022 Saudi Arabian Grand Prix
 Winner:  Max Verstappen (Red Bull Racing-RBPT)
 April 10:  2022 Australian Grand Prix
 Winner:  Charles Leclerc (Ferrari)
 April 24:  2022 Emilia Romagna Grand Prix
 Winner:  Max Verstappen (Red Bull Racing-RBPT)
 May 8:  2022 Miami Grand Prix
 Winner:  Max Verstappen (Red Bull Racing-RBPT)
 May 22:  2022 Spanish Grand Prix
 Winner:  Max Verstappen (Red Bull Racing-RBPT)
 May 29:  2022 Monaco Grand Prix
 Winner:  Sergio Pérez (Red Bull Racing-RBPT)
 June 12:  2022 Azerbaijan Grand Prix
 Winner:  Max Verstappen (Red Bull Racing-RBPT)
 June 19:  2022 Canadian Grand Prix
 Winner:  Max Verstappen (Red Bull Racing-RBPT)
 July 3:  2022 British Grand Prix
 Winner:  Carlos Sainz Jr. (Ferrari)
 July 10:  2022 Austrian Grand Prix
 Winner:  Charles Leclerc (Ferrari)
 July 24:  2022 French Grand Prix
 Winner:  Max Verstappen (Red Bull Racing-RBPT)
 July 31:  2022 Hungarian Grand Prix
 Winner:  Max Verstappen (Red Bull Racing-RBPT)
 August 28:  2022 Belgian Grand Prix
 Winner:  Max Verstappen (Red Bull Racing-RBPT)
 September 4:  2022 Dutch Grand Prix
 Winner:  Max Verstappen (Red Bull Racing-RBPT)
 September 9:  2022 Italian Grand Prix
 Winner:  Max Verstappen (Red Bull Racing-RBPT)
 October 2:  2022 Singapore Grand Prix
 Winner:  Sergio Pérez (Red Bull Racing-RBPT)
 October 9:  2022 Japanese Grand Prix
 Winner:  Max Verstappen (Red Bull Racing-RBPT)
 October 23:  2022 US Grand Prix
 Winner:  Max Verstappen (Red Bull Racing-RBPT)
 October 30:  2022 Mexico City Grand Prix
 Winner:  Max Verstappen (Red Bull Racing-RBPT)
 November 13:  2022 Brazilian Grand Prix
 November 20:  2022 Abu Dhabi Grand Prix
 World Drivers' Champion:  Max Verstappen (Red Bull Racing-RBPT)
 World Constructors' Champion:

2021–22 Formula E World Championship
 January 28:  2022 Diriyah ePrix #1
 Winner:  Nyck de Vries (Mercedes-EQ Formula E Team)
 January 29:  2022 Diriyah ePrix #2
 Winner:  Edoardo Mortara (ROKiT Venturi Racing)
 February 12:  2022 Mexico City ePrix
 Winner:  Pascal Wehrlein (Porsche Formula E Team)
 April 9:  2022 Rome ePrix #1
 Winner:  Mitch Evans (Jaguar Racing)
 April 10:  2022 Rome ePrix #2
 Winner:  Mitch Evans (Jaguar Racing)
 April 30:  2022 Monaco ePrix
 Winner:  Stoffel Vandoorne (Mercedes-EQ Formula E Team)
 May 14:  2022 Berlin ePrix #1
 Winner:  Edoardo Mortara (ROKiT Venturi Racing)
 May 15:  2022 Berlin ePrix #2
 Winner:  Nyck de Vries (Mercedes-EQ Formula E Team)
 June 4:  2022 Jakarta ePrix
 Winner:  Mitch Evans (Jaguar Racing)
 July 2:  2022 Marrakesh ePrix
 Winner:  Edoardo Mortara (ROKiT Venturi Racing)
 July 16:  2022 New York City ePrix #1
 Winner:  Nick Cassidy (Envision Racing)
 July 17:  2022 New York City ePrix #2
 Winner:  António Félix da Costa (DS Techeetah)

2022 FIA World Endurance Championship
 March 18:  2022 1000 Miles of Sebring
 Hypercar winners:  Alpine Elf Team ( Nicolas Lapierre,  André Negrão,  Matthieu Vaxivière)
 LMP2 winners:  United Autosports USA ( Paul di Resta,  Josh Pierson,  Oliver Jarvis)
 LMGTE Pro winners:  Porsche GT Team ( Kévin Estre,  Michael Christensen)
 LMGTE Am winners:  Northwest AMR ( Paul Dalla Lana,  David Pittard,  Nicki Thiim)
 May 7:  2022 6 Hours of Spa-Francorchamps
 Hypercar winners:  Toyota Gazoo Racing ( Mike Conway,  Kamui Kobayashi,  José María López)
 LMP2 winners:  W Racing Team ( Robin Frijns,  Sean Gelael,  René Rast)
 LMGTE Pro winners:  AF Corse ( James Calado,  Alessandro Pier Guidi)
 LMGTE Am winners:  Dempsey-Proton Racing ( Sebastian Priaulx,  Christian Ried,  Harry Tincknell)

2022 World Touring Car Cup
 May 7 – 8: Round #1 at  Circuit de Pau-Ville
 Winners:  Néstor Girolami (Race 1) /  Mikel Azcona (Race 2)
 May 26 – 28: Round #2 at  Nürburgring
 Cancelled
 June 11 – 12: Round #3 at  Hungaroring
 Winners:  Mikel Azcona (Race 1) /  Santiago Urrutia (Race 2)
 June 25 – 26: Round #4 at  Aragón
 Winners:  Gilles Magnus (Race 1) /  Mikel Azcona (Race 2)
 July 2 – 3: Round #5 at  Vila Real
 Winners:  Santiago Urrutia (Race 1) /  Robert Huff (Race 2)
 July 23 – 24: Round #6 at  Vallelunga
 Winners:  Néstor Girolami (Race 1) /  Gilles Magnus (Race 2)

2022 European Autocross Championship

2022 European Drag Racing Championship

2022 World Rally Championship
 January 20 – 23:  Monte Carlo Rally
 Overall winners:  Sébastien Loeb &  Isabelle Galmiche (M-Sport Ford WRT)
 WRC-2 winners:  Andreas Mikkelsen &  Torstein Eriksen (Toksport WRT)
 WRC-3 winners:  Sami Pajari &  Enni Mälkönen
 February 24 – 27:  Rally Sweden
 Overall winners:  Kalle Rovanperä &  Jonne Halttunen (Toyota Gazoo Racing WRT)
 WRC-2 winners:  Andreas Mikkelsen &  Torstein Eriksen (Toksport WRT)
 WRC-3 winners:  Lauri Joona &  Mikael Korhonen
 April 21 – 24:  Croatia Rally
 Overall winners:  Kalle Rovanperä &  Jonne Halttunen (Toyota Gazoo Racing WRT)
 WRC-2 winners:  Yohan Rossel &  Benjamin Boulloud (PH Sport)
 WRC-3 winners:  Zoltán László &  Tamás Kürti
 May 19 – 22:  Rally de Portugal
 Overall winners:  Kalle Rovanperä &  Jonne Halttunen (Toyota Gazoo Racing WRT)
 WRC-2 winners:  Yohan Rossel &  Valentin Sarreaud (PH Sport)
 WRC-3 winners:  Sami Pajari &  Enni Mälkönen
 June 2 – 5:  Rally Italia Sardegna
 Overall winners:  Ott Tänak &  Martin Järveoja (Hyundai Shell Mobis WRT)
 WRC-2 winners:  Nikolay Gryazin &  Konstantin Aleksandrov (Toksport WRT)
 WRC-3 winners:  Jan Černý &  Tomáš Střeska
 June 23 – 26:  Safari Rally Kenya
 Overall winners:  Kalle Rovanperä &  Jonne Halttunen (Toyota Gazoo Racing WRT)
 WRC-2 winners:  Kajetan Kajetanowicz &  Maciej Szczepaniak
 WRC-3 winners:  Maxine Wahome &  Murage Waigwa
 July 14 – 17:  Rally Estonia
 Overall winners:  Kalle Rovanperä &  Jonne Halttunen (Toyota Gazoo Racing WRT)
 WRC-2 winners:  Andreas Mikkelsen &  Torstein Eriksen (Toksport WRT)
 WRC-3 winners:  Sami Pajari &  Enni Mälkönen

2022 FIA World Rallycross Championship

2022 European Rally Championship

2022 World Rally-Raid Championship
 January 1 – 14: 2022 Dakar Rally in 
 Bikes winner:  Sam Sunderland (Gas Gas Factory Team)
 Quads winner:  Alexandre Giroud (Yamaha Racing – SMX – Drag'On)
 Cars winner:  Nasser Al-Attiyah (Toyota Gazoo Racing)
 Light prototypes winner:  Francisco López Contardo (EKS – South Racing)
 SSV winner:  Austin Jones (Can-Am Factory South Racing)
 Trucks winner:  Dmitry Sotnikov (Kamaz Master)
 Classics winner:  Serge Mogno (Team FSO)
 March 5 – 10: Abu Dhabi Desert Challenge in 
 Bikes winner:  Sam Sunderland (Gas Gas Factory Team)
 Cars winner:  Stéphane Peterhansel (Audi RS Q e-tron)
 T3 winner:  Francisco López Contardo (EKS – South Racing)
 T4 winner:  Marek Goczał (Cobant-Energylandia Rally Team
 T5 winner:  Kees Koolen (Iveco PowerStar)

2022 Extreme E Championship
 February 19 – 20: Desert X-Prix in  Neom
 Winners:  Rosberg X Racing ( Johan Kristoffersson &  Mikaela Åhlin-Kottulinsky)

2022 FIA World Cup for Cross-Country Bajas
 February 11 – 13:  Baja Russia – Northern Forest
 Winners:  Vladimir Vasilyev &  Oleg Uperenko (Mini Cooper Countryman)
 February 17 – 19:  Jordan Baja
 Winners:  Saleh Alsaif &  Egor Okhotnikov (BRP Can-Am Maverick X3)

2022 FIM Bajas World Cup
 February 17 – 19:  Jordan Baja
 Winner:  Mohammed Al Balooshi
 March 24 – 26:  Qatar International Baja
 Winner:  Konrad Dąbrowski
 May 6 – 8:  Baja do Oeste
 Winner:  Micael Simão

2022 MotoGP World Championship
 March 6:  Grand Prix of Qatar
 MotoGP winner:  Enea Bastianini
 Moto2 winner:  Celestino Vietti
 Moto3 winner:  Andrea Migno
 March 20:  Pertamina Grand Prix of Indonesia
 MotoGP winner:  Miguel Oliveira
 Moto2 winner:  Somkiat Chantra
 Moto3 winner:  Dennis Foggia
 April 3:  Gran Premio Michelin de la República Argentina
 MotoGP winner:  Aleix Espargaró
 Moto2 winner:  Celestino Vietti
 Moto3 winner:  Sergio García
April 10:  Red Bull Grand Prix of the Americas
 MotoGP winner:  Enea Bastianini
 Moto2 winner:  Tony Arbolino
 Moto3 winner:  Jaume Masià
April 24:  Grande Prémio Tissot de Portugal
 MotoGP winner:  Fabio Quartararo
 Moto2 winner:  Joe Roberts
 Moto3 winner:  Sergio García
May 1:  Gran Premio Red Bull de España
 MotoGP winner:  Francesco Bagnaia
 Moto2 winner:  Ai Ogura
 Moto3 winner:  Izan Guevara
 MotoE winner:  Eric Granado (both races)
May 15:  Shark Grand Prix de France
 MotoGP winner:  Enea Bastianini
 Moto2 winner:  Augusto Fernández
 Moto3 winner:  Jaume Masià
 MotoE winner:  Mattia Casadei (Race 1) /  Dominique Aegerter (Race 2)
May 29:  Gran Premio d'Italia Oakley
 MotoGP winner:  Francesco Bagnaia
 Moto2 winner:  Pedro Acosta
 Moto3 winner:  Sergio García
 MotoE winner:  Dominique Aegerter (Race 1) /  Matteo Ferrari (Race 2)
June 5:  Gran Premi Monster Energy de Catalunya
 MotoGP winner:  Fabio Quartararo
 Moto2 winner:  Celestino Vietti
 Moto3 winner:  Izan Guevara

2022 Superbike World Championship 
 April 9 & 10: Round #1 in  MotorLand Aragón
 WorldSBK winners:  Jonathan Rea (Race 1) /  Álvaro Bautista (SP Race & Race 2)
 WorldSSP winners:  Lorenzo Baldassarri (Race 1) /  Dominique Aegerter (Race 2)
 April 23 & 24: Round #2 in  Assen
 WorldSBK winners:  Jonathan Rea (Race 1 & SP Race) /  Álvaro Bautista (Race 2)
 WorldSSP winners:  Dominique Aegerter (both races)
 May 21 & 22: Round #3 in  Estoril
 WorldSBK winners:  Álvaro Bautista (Race 1) /  Jonathan Rea (SP Race & Race 2)
 WorldSSP winners:  Dominique Aegerter (both races)

2022 FIM Motocross World Championship
 February 27:  MXGP of Great Britain
 MXGP winners:  Tim Gajser (Race 1) /  Jorge Prado (Race 2)
 MX2 winner:  Simon Längenfelder (both races)
 March 6:  MXGP of Lombardia
 MXGP winners:  Jorge Prado (Race 1) /  Tim Gajser (Race 2)
 MX2 winner:  Jago Geerts (both races)
 March 20:  MXGP of Argentina
 MXGP winners:  Maxime Renaux (Race 1) /  Tim Gajser (Race 2)
 MX2 winners:  Jago Geerts (Race 1) /  Tom Vialle (Race 2)
 April 3:  MXGP of Portugal
 MXGP winners:  Jorge Prado (Race 1) /  Tim Gajser (Race 2)
 MX2 winners:  Tom Vialle (Race 1) /  Jago Geerts (Race 2)
 April 10:  MXGP of Trentino
 MXGP winner:  Tim Gajser (both races)
 MX2 winner:  Tom Vialle (both races)
 April 24:  MXGP of Latvia
 MXGP winner:  Tim Gajser (both races)
 MX2 winner:  Jago Geerts (both races)
 May 8:  MXGP of Italy
 MXGP winner:  Tim Gajser (both races)
 MX2 winners:  Jago Geerts (Race 1) /  Tom Vialle (Race 2)
 May 15:  MXGP of Sardegna
 MXGP winner:  Calvin Vlaanderen (both races)
 MX2 winners:  Jago Geerts (Race 1) /  Tom Vialle (Race 2)
 May 29:  MXGP of Spain
 MXGP winner:  Maxime Renaux (both races)
 MX2 winners:  Tom Vialle (both races)
 June 5:  MXGP of France
 MXGP winners:  Jeremy Seewer (Race 1) /  Glenn Coldenhoff (Race 2)
 MX2 winners:  Tom Vialle (Race 1) /  Thibault Benistant (Race 2)
 June 12:  MXGP of Germany
 MXGP winners:  Tim Gajser (Race 1) /  Jeremy Seewer (Race 2)
 MX2 winners:  Tom Vialle (Race 1) /  Thibault Benistant (Race 2)
 June 26:  MXGP of Indonesia
 MXGP winner:  Tim Gajser (both races)
 MX2 winner:  Tom Vialle (both races)
 July 17:  MXGP of Czech Republic
 MXGP winners:  Jeremy Seewer (Race 1) /  Maxime Renaux (Race 2)
 MX2 winners:  Thibault Benistant (Race 1) /  Jago Geerts (Race 2)
 July 24:  MXGP of Flanders
 MXGP winners:  Brian Bogers (Race 1) /  Glenn Coldenhoff (Race 2)
 MX2 winners:  Kay de Wolf (Race 1) /  Jago Geerts (Race 2)

2022 FIM SuperEnduro World Championship
 December 4, 2021: #1 in  Łódź
 Winner:  Billy Bolt
 Juniors winner:  Dominik Olszowy
 February 5: #2 in  Budapest
 Winner:  Billy Bolt
 March 3: #3 in  Jerusalem
 Winner:  Billy Bolt
 March 19: #4 in  Riesa
 Winner:  Billy Bolt
 March 20: #5 in  Riesa
 Winner:  Billy Bolt

2022 AMA Supercross Championship
 January 8: #1 in  Anaheim
 450SX winner:  Ken Roczen
 250SX winner:  Christian Craig
 January 15: #2 in  Oakland
 450SX winner:  Jason Anderson
 250SX winner:  Christian Craig
 January 22: #3 in  San Diego
 450SX winner:  Chase Sexton
 250SX winner:  Michael Mosiman
 January 29: #4 in  Anaheim
 450SX winner:  Eli Tomac
 250SX winner:  Christian Craig
 February 5: #5 in  Glendale
 450SX winner:  Eli Tomac
 250SX winner:  Hunter Lawrence
 February 12: #6 in  Anaheim
 450SX winner:  Jason Anderson
 250SX winner:  Christian Craig
 February 19: #7 in  Minneapolis
 450SX winner:  Jason Anderson
 250SX winner:  Jett Lawrence
 February 26: #8 in  Arlington
 450SX winner:  Eli Tomac
 250SX winner:  Cameron McAdoo
 March 5: #9 in  Daytona
 450SX winner:  Eli Tomac
 250SX winner:  Jett Lawrence
 March 12: #10 in  Detroit
 450SX winner:  Eli Tomac
 250SX winner:  Jett Lawrence
 March 19: #11 in  Indianapolis
 450SX winner:  Eli Tomac
 250SX winner:  Jett Lawrence
 March 26: #12 in  Seattle
 450SX winner:  Eli Tomac
 250SX winner:  Hunter Lawrence
 April 9: #13 in  St. Louis
 450SX winner:  Marvin Musquin
 250SX winner:  RJ Hampshire
 April 16: #14 in  Hampton
 450SX winner:  Jason Anderson
 250SX winner:  Hunter Lawrence
 April 23: #15 in  Foxborough
 450SX winner:  Jason Anderson
 250SX winner:  Jett Lawrence
 April 30: #16 in  Denver
 450SX winner:  Jason Anderson
 250SX winner:  Hunter Lawrence
 May 7: #17 in  Salt Lake City
 450SX winner:  Jason Anderson
 250SX winner:  Nate Thrasher

2022 FIM Ice Speedway World Championship
 February 12 & 13: #1 in  Tolyatti
 Winner:  Nikita Bogdanov (2 times)
 April 2 & 3: #2 in  Heerenveen
 Winner:  Martin Haarahiltunen (2 times)

2022 Speedway Grand Prix
 April 30: #1 in  Goričan
 Winner:  Bartosz Zmarzlik
 May 14: #2 in  Warsaw
 Winner:  Max Fricke
 May 28: #3 in  Prague
 Winner:  Martin Vaculík
 June 4: #4 in  Teterow
 Winner:  Patryk Dudek

2022 FIM Supermoto World Championship
 April 17: #1 in  Busca
 Winner:  Marc Reiner Schmidt
 May 8: #2 in  Alcarràs
 Winner:  Diogo Moreira

2022 FIM Sidecar Motocross World Championship
 April 24: #1 in  Markelo
 Winners:  Etienne Bax &  Ondřej Čermák
 May 22: #2 in  Markelo
 Winners:  Etienne Bax &  Ondřej Čermák

2022 FIM Enduro World Championship
 May 6 – 8:  EnduroGP of Spain
 Stage 1 winner:  Andrea Verona
 Stage 2 winner:  Josep García
 May 13 – 15:  EnduroGP of Portugal
 Stage 1 winner:  Wil Ruprecht
 Stage 2 winner:  Wil Ruprecht

Muay Thai

Netball
 January 15 – 19: 2022 Netball Quad Series in 
 Winners: , 2nd place: , 3rd place: , 4th place: 
 February 11 – 19: 2021 OECS/ECCB International Netball Series in 
 July 28 – August 6: 2023 Netball World Cup in

Nordic combined

Orienteering

 March 13 – 19: 2022 World Ski Orienteering Championships in  Kemi
 June 26 – 30: 2022 World Orienteering Championships in 
 July 15 – 20: 2022 World MTB Orienteering Championships in  Falun
 July 19 – 23: 2022 World Trail Orienteering Championships in  Jelenia Góra

Continental championships
 May 18 – 22: 2022 European MTB Orienteering Championships in  Ignalina

2022 Orienteering World Cup 
 May 26 – 29: Round 1 in  Borås
 Sprint winners:  Kasper Fosser (m) /  Tove Alexandersson (f)
 Knock-out sprint winners:  Matthias Kyburz (m) /  Tove Alexandersson (f)
 Sprint relay winners:  2 (Lina Strand, Martin Regborn, Emil Svensk, Karolin Ohlsson)

Parkour
 October 14 – 16: 2022 Parkour World Championships in  Tokyo

Pickleball
 April 22 – 30: 2022 Minto US Open Pickleball Championships in Naples, Florida
 June 29 – July 3: 2022 English Open Pickleball Championships, Southampton, England
 July: Pickleball accepted as an exhibition sport at the 2022 Maccabiah Games
 August 25 – 28: 2022 French Open Pickleball Championships in Saint-Raphaël, France
 September 9 – 11: 2022 Italian Open Pickleball Championships in Tocco da Casauria, Italy
 November 5 – 13: 2022 Margaritaville USA Pickleball National Championships in Indian Wells, California

Powerboat racing

2022 UIM XCAT World Championship
 March 4 – 6: #1 in  Fujairah
 Race 1 winners:  Giovanni Carpitella &  Darren Nicholson (222 Offshore)
 Race 2 winners:  Tomaso Polli &  Matteo Nicolini (Six)

2022 UIM V2 Powerboat World Championship
 April 22 – 24: #1 in  St. Paul's Bay
 Winners:  El Diablo (Race 1) /  Freccia Blu (Races 2 & 3)

2022 Formula 500 World Championship
 May 14 & 15: #1 in  Jedovnice
 Winner:  Attila Havas

2022 Formula 250 World Championship
 May 14 & 15: #1 in  Jedovnice
 Winner:  Péter Bodor

2022 Formula 125 World Championship
 May 14 & 15: #1 in  Jedovnice
 Winner:  Joonas Lember

Powerlifting
 May 21 – 29: 2022 World Classic & Equipped Bench Press Championship in  Almaty
 June 6 – 12: 2022 World Classic Open Powerlifting Championships in  Sun City
 November 14 – 20: 2022 World Equipped Open Powerlifting Championships in  Viborg

Racquetball

 August 19 – 27: 2022 Racquetball World Championships in  San Luis Potosí

2022 International Racquetball Tour

Grand Slam
 January 20 – 23: 2022 Suivant Consulting Grand Slam in  Lilburn
 Singles:  Andree Parrilla def.  Kane Waselenchuk, 14–15, 15–2, 11–10.
 Doubles:  Conrrado Moscoso &  Roland Keller Vargas def.  Rodrigo Montoya &  Javier Mar, 15–14, 15–14.

Tier 1
 March 10 – 13: 43rd Lewis Drug Pro/Am in  Sioux Falls

Tier 3
 January 14 – 16: 2022 Wintergreen Classic in  Millersville
  Daniel de la Rosa def.  Mario Mercado, 9–15, 15–10, 11–5.

Tier 4
 March 25 & 26: 2022 Warhawk Open in  Monroe

Tier 5
 January 7 & 8: 2022 Racquetball Blizzard Tournament in  St. Louis
  Andrew Gleason def.  Blase Zera, 15–8, 15–1.
 January 28 – 30: 2022 NRT Kick Off Tournament in  Omaha
  Adam Manilla def.  John Goth, 15–5, 15–8.
 February 4 & 5: 2022 Midwest Racquetball Championships in  St. Louis
 February 25 – 27: Peachtree OPEN Championships in  Lilburn

2022 Ladies Professional Racquetball Tour
Super MAX Slam
 June 9 – 12: 2022 TeamRoot.Com Super MAX Slam! in  Overland Park

Grand Slam
 May 12 – 15: 2022 Sweet Caroline Open in  Greenville

Tier 1
 February 17 – 19: 2022 Vero Beach Open in  Vero Beach
 March 4 – 6: 2022 Boston Open in  Boston
 April 29 – May 1: 2022 Battle at the Alamo in  San Antonio

Outdoor
 March 24 – 27: 2022 Beach Bash in  Hollywood

Racketlon
 August 19 – 22: 2022 FIR World Championships Juniors & Seniors in  Vienna
 August 24 – 28: 2022 FIR World Championships Elite & Amateurs in  Graz

2022 FIR World Tour
 March 4 – 6: IWT French Open in  Montreuil
 March 18 – 20: CHA Spanish Open in  Elche
 April 8 – 10: CHA Nick Matthew Steel City Open in  Sheffield
 April 23 & 24: CHA Moscow Open in 
 June 24 – 26: IWT Swiss Open in  Zürich
 July 8 – 10: IWT Latvian Open in  Riga
 July 22 – 24: IWT London Open in  Roehampton
 August 5 – 7: IWT German Open in  Nußloch
 October 14 & 15: CHA Romanian Open in  Bucharest
 October 28 – November 6: IWT Indian Open & CHA in  TBD
 November 11 – 13: IWT Czech Open in  Prague

Ringette
 October 31 – November 6: 2022 World Ringette Championships in  Espoo

Rowing
 January 29 & 30: 2022 European Rowing Indoor Championships in  Jönköping
 Competition cancelled.
 February 25 & 26: 2022 World Rowing Indoor Championships in  Hamburg
 August 11 – 14: 2022 European Rowing Championships in  Munich
 September 18 – 25: 2022 World Rowing Championships in  Račice
 October 7 – 9: 2022 World Rowing Coastal Championships in  Saundersfoot
 October 14 – 16: 2022 World Rowing Beach Sprint Finals in  Saundersfoot

Rugby league
 October 15 – November 19: 2021 Rugby League World Cup in

Rugby sevens
 September 9 – 11: 2022 Rugby World Cup Sevens in  Cape Town

2021–22 World Rugby Sevens Series
 November 26 & 27, 2021: Dubai Sevens I in  Dubai
 Winners: , 2nd: , 3rd: , 4th: 
 December 3 & 4, 2021: Dubai Sevens II in  Dubai
 Winners: , 2nd: , 3rd: , 4th: 
 January 21 – 23: Spain Sevens I in  Málaga
 Winners: , 2nd: , 3rd: , 4th: 
 January 28 – 30: Spain Sevens II in  Sevilla
 Winners: , 2nd: , 3rd: , 4th: 
 April 9 & 10: Singapore Sevens in 
 Winners: , 2nd: , 3rd: , 4th: 
 April 16 & 17: Canada Sevens in  Vancouver
 Winners: , 2nd: , 3rd: , 4th: 
 May 20 – 22: France Sevens in  Toulouse
 Winners: , 2nd: , 3rd: , 4th:

2021–22 World Rugby Women's Sevens Series
 November 26 – 27, 2021: Dubai Women's Sevens I in  Dubai
 Winners: , 2nd: , 3rd: , 4th: 
 December 3 – 4, 2021: Dubai Women's Sevens II in  Dubai
 Winners: , 2nd: , 3rd: , 4th: 
 January 21 – 23: Spain Sevens I in  Málaga
 Winners: , 2nd: , 3rd: , 4th: 
 January 28 – 30: Spain Sevens II in  Sevilla
 Winners: , 2nd: , 3rd: , 4th: 
 April 30 – May 1: Canada Women's Sevens in  Langford
 Winners: , 2nd: , 3rd: , 4th: 
 May 20 – 22: France Women's Sevens in  Toulouse
 Winners: , 2nd: , 3rd: , 4th: 

Rugby Union
 October 8 – November 21: 2021 Rugby World Cup in 
 February 5 – March 19: 2022 Six Nations Championship
 February 5 – March 19: 2022 Women's Six Nations Championship
 September 24, 2021 – June 23/24/25: //// 2021–22 United Rugby Championship

Rugby Europe
 February 5 – March 20: ///// 2022 Rugby Europe Championship
 October 9, 2021 – TBD: ///// 2021–22 Rugby Europe Trophy

Club competitions
 December 10, 2021 – May 28: //// 2021–22 European Rugby Champions Cup (final in  Marseille)
 December 10, 2021 – May 27: //// 2021–22 EPCR Challenge Cup (final in  Marseille)

Sailing

 February 18 – 23: 2022 Raceboard European Championships in  Vilamoura
 April 11 – 16: 2022 Windsurfing European Championships in  Cagliari
 April 12 – 16: 2022 Zoom8 European Championships in  Mörbisch am See
 April 14 – 21: 2022 U21 Laser and Laser Radial European Championships in  Hourtin
 April 17 – 23: 2022 Techno 293 and 293 Plus European Championships in  Cagliari
 April 29 – May 6: 2022 A-Catamaran World Championship in  Houston
 Open discipline standings:   Ravi Parent,   Jakub Surowiec,   Riley Gibbs
 Classic discipline standings:   Andrew Landenberger,   Micky Todd,   Andreas Landenberger
 April 29 – May 6: 2022 Optimist Asian & Oceanian American Championship in  Yeosu
 May 9 – 15: 2022 Melges 24 World Championship in  Fort Lauderdale
 Final standings:   Raza Mixta,   Zenda Express,   Monsoon
 May 10 – 24: 2022 Hobie 16 World Championship in 
 May 12 – 16: 2022 Lightning Master World Championship in  Charleston
 May 15 – 22: 2022 IQFoil European Championships in  Nago-Torbole
 May 15 – 20: 2022 2.4mR European Championship in  Quiberon
 May 16 – 21: 2022 Lightning World Championship in  Charleston
 Final standings:   Team PatStrong,   Ojo de Lince,   Argentina
 May 21 – 28: 2022 ILCA 7 Men's World Championship in  Nuevo Vallarta
 Final standings:   Jean-Baptiste Bernaz,   Pavlos Kontides,   Filip Jurišić
 May 23 – 29: 2022 Raceboard World Championships in  Balatonföldvár
 May 30 – June 7: 2022 ILCA 7 Masters World Championship in  Nuevo Vallarta
 June 9 – 12: 2022 Eurosaf Youth Match Race European Championship in  Ledro
 June 10 – 18: 2022 6m World Championship in  Sanxenxo
 June 12 – 17: 2022 Dragon World Championship in  Kühlungsborn
 June 18 – 22: 2022 World Foil Championships
 June 18 – 25: 2022 ILCA 4 Youth European Championships in  Dziwnów
 June 22 – 26: 2022 Match Racing Open European Championship in  Ravenna
 June 30 – July 8: 2022 29er European Championship in  Copenhagen

2022 World Match World Championship
 April 19 – 23: 2022 Congressional Cup (WC #1) in  Long Beach

2022 World Match Racing Tour
 April 13 – 16: 2022 Ficker Cup (WMRT #1) in  Long Beach
 April 28 – May 1: Szczecin Match Race (WMRT #2) in  Szczecin
 May 6 – 8: Porto Montenegro Match Race (WMRT #3) in  Tivat
 May 20 – 22: NJK Open Spring Cup 2022 (WMRT #4) in 
 May 24 – 29: Island Match Cup (WMRT #5) in 
 June 2 – 6: Match Race (WMRT #6) in 
 June 4 & 5: GKSS Spring Cup (WMRT #7) in 
 June 16 – 19: OM International Ledro Match Race 2022 in  Ledro

2022 Sail Grand Prix
 May 14 & 15: SailGP #1 in  Hamilton
 June 18 & 19: SailGP #2 in  Chicago

2022 iQFOiL International Games
 January 24 – 29: iQFOiL International Games #1 in  Lanzarote
 Winners:  Nicolas Goyard (m) /  Pilar Lamadrid (f)
 March 8 – 13: iQFOiL International Games #2 in  Cadiz
 March 22 – 27: iQFOiL International Games #3 in  Palma de Mallorca
 May 3 – 8: iQFOiL International Games #4 in  Tremosine sul Garda
 July 23 – 30: iQFOiL International Games #5 in 

Sambo

Shooting sports
 August 1 – 9: 2021 World Running Target Championships in  Châteauroux
 September 27 – October 10: 2022 World Shotgun Championships in  Osijek
 October 12 – 27: ISSF World Shooting Championships in  Cairo

2022 ISSF World Cup
 February 28 – March 6: WC #1 in  Cairo
 10m Air Pistol winners:  Chaudhary Saurabh (m) /  Anna Korakaki (f)
 25m Rapid Fire Pistol winners:  Jean Quiquampoix (m) /  Mathilde Lamolle (f)
 10m Air Rifle winners:  Danilo Sollazzo (m) /  Océanne Muller (f)
 50m Rifle 3 Positions winners:  Patrik Jány (m) /  Jeanette Hegg Duestad (f)
 10m Air Pistol Mixed Team winners:  (Zorana Arunović, Damir Mikec)
 25m Rapid Fire Pistol Mixed Team winners:  (Rhythm Sangwan, Anish Anish)
 10m Air Rifle Mixed Team winners:  (Jeanette Hegg Duestad, Jon-Hermann Hegg)
 50m Rifle 3 Positions Mixed Team winners:  (Jenny Stene, Jon-Hermann Hegg)
 10m Air Pistol Team winners:  (Michael Schwald, Robin Walter, Philipp Grimm) (m) /  (Esha Singh, Ruchita Vinerkar, Shri Nivetha Paramanantham) (f)
 25m Rapid Fire Pistol Team winners:  (Christian Reitz, Oliver Geis, Florian Peter) (m) /  (Rahi Sarnobat, Rhythm Sangwan, Esha Singh) (f)
 10m Air Rifle Team winners:  (Miran Maričić, Petar Gorša, Borna Petanjek) (m) /  (Eszter Mészáros, Eszter Dénes, Gitta Bajos) (f)
 50m Rifle 3 Positions Team winners:  (Thomas Mathis, Gernot Rumpler, Andreas Thum) (m) /  (Urška Kuharič, Živa Dvoršak, Klavdija Jerovšek) (f)
 March 8 – 19: WC #2 in  Nicosia
 Trap winners:  Oğuzhan Tüzün (m) /  Zuzana Rehák-Štefečeková (f)
 Skeet winners:  Azmy Mehelba (m) /  Amber Hill (f)
 Trap Team winners:  (Naser Al-Meqlad, Talal Al-Rashidi, Abdulrahman Al-Faihan) (m) /  (Penny Smith, Laetisha Scanlan, Catherine Skinner) (f)
 Skeet Team winners:  (Tammaro Cassandro, Elia Sdruccioli, Gabriele Rossetti) (m) /  (Chiara Cainero, Martina Bartolomei, Diana Bacosi) (f)
 Trap Mixed Team winners:  (Murat İlbilgi, Rümeysa Pelin Kaya)
 Skeet Mixed Team winners:  (Tammaro Cassandro, Diana Bacosi)
 March 27 – April 7: WC #3 in  Lima
 Trap winners:  Alberto Fernández (m) /  Gaia Ragazzini (f)
 Skeet winners:  Nicolás Pacheco Espinosa (m) /  Dania Jo Vizzi (f)
 Trap Team winners:  (William Hinton, Derrick Mein, Casey Wallace) (m) /  (Kayle Browning, Aeriel Skinner, Rachel Tozier) (f)
 Skeet Team winners:  (Cristian Ciccotti, Domenico Simeone, Marco Sablone) (m) /  (Caitlin Connor, Austen Smith, Dania Jo Vizzi) (f)
 Trap Mixed Team winners:  (Alberto Fernández, Fátima Gálvez)
 Skeet Mixed Team winners:  (Domenico Simeone, Simona Scocchetti)
 April 9 – 19: WC #4 in  Rio de Janeiro
 10m Air Rifle winners:  Petar Gorša (m) /  Anna Janssen (f)
 10m Air Pistol winners:  Juraj Tužinský (m) /  Zorana Arunović (f)
 10m Air Rifle Mixed Team winners:  (Lucie Brázdová, Jiří Přívratský)
 10m Air Pistol Mixed Team winners:  (Sandra Reitz, Christian Reitz)
 10m Air Rifle Team winners:  (Lucas Kozeniesky, Rylan Kissell, William Shaner) (m) /  (Anna Janssen, Lisa Müller, Anita Magold) (f)
 10m Air Pistol Team winners:  (Paul Fröhlich, Robin Walter, David Probst) (m) /  (Golnoush Sebghatollahi, Hanieh Rostamian, Elham Harijani) (f)
 50m Rifle 3 Positions winners:  Jiří Přívratský (m) /  Jeanette Hegg Duestad (f)
 25m Rapid Fire Pistol winners:  Christian Reitz (m) /  Camille Jedrzejewski (f)
 25m Rapid Fire Pistol Team winners:  (Christian Reitz, Oliver Geis, Florian Peter) (m) /  (Doreen Vennekamp, Sandra Reitz, Monika Karsch) (f)
 50m Rifle 3 Positions Team winners:  (Jiří Přívratský, František Smetana, Petr Nymburský) (m) /  (Jeanette Hegg Duestad, Kathrine Lund, Jenny Stene) (f)
 50m Rifle 3 Positions Mixed Team winners:  (Lucie Brázdová, Jiří Přívratský)

2022 ISSF Grand Prix 10m Rifle/Pistol
 January 12 – 16: Grand Prix #1 in  Ruše
 10m Air Pistol winners:  Ruslan Lunev (m) /  Vitalina Batsarashkina (f)
 10m Air Rifle winners:  Miran Maričić (m) /  Andrea Arsović (f)
 10m Air Pistol Mixed Team winners:  (Anna Korakaki, Dionysios Korakakis)
 10m Air Rifle Mixed Team winners:  I (István Péni, Eszter Mészáros)
 Air Pistol Team winners:  (Artem Chernousov, Vadim Mukhametyanov, Anton Aristarkhov) (m) /  (Vitalina Batsarashkina, Daria Sirotkina, Anna Asomchik) (f)
 Air Rifle Team winners:  (Vladimir Maslennikov, Evgenii Potapov, Alexander Dryagin) (m) /  (Aneta Stankiewicz, Natalia Kochańska, Julia Piotrowska) (f)
 January 18 – 22: Grand Prix #2 in  Osijek
 10m Air Pistol winners:  Artem Chernousov (m) /  Veronika Major (f)
 10m Air Rifle winners:  Serhiy Kulish (m) /  Andrea Arsović (f)
 Air Pistol Team winners:  (Damir Mikec, Dusko Petrov, Dimitrije Grgić) (m) /  (Sara Costantino, Brunella Aria, Chiara Giancamilli) (f)
 Air Rifle Team winners:  (Petar Gorša, Miran Maričić, Borna Petanjek) (m) /  (Yulia Kruglova, Yulia Karimova, Aigul Khabibullina) (f)
 10m Air Pistol Mixed Team winners:  (Vitalina Batsarashkina, Artem Chernousov)
 10m Air Rifle Mixed Team winners:  I (Océanne Muller, Brian Baudouin)
 February 8 – 18: Grand Prix #3 in  Jakarta
 10m Air Rifle winners:  Napis Tortungpanich (m) /  Laura Ilie (f)
 10m Air Pistol winners:  Muhamad Iqbal Raia Prabowa (m) /  Nurul Syasya Nadiah Mohd Ariffin (f)
 Air Pistol Team winners:  (Muhamad Iqbal Raia Prabowa, Wira Sukmana, Deny Pratama) (m) /  (Teo Shun Xie, Xiu Hong Teh, Mak Amanda Sao Keng) (f)
 Air Rifle Team winners:  (Gai Tianrui, Zen Joi Lionel Wong, Marat Veloso) (m) /  (Natanya Tan, Adele Tan, Fernel Tan) (f)
 10m Air Pistol Mixed Team winners:  2 (Natsara Champalat & Tatsura Banphaveerachon)
 10m Air Rifle Mixed Team winners:  I (Monica Daryanti & Fathur Gustafian)

Ski jumping

Ski mountaineering

Skyrunning
 February 4 & 5: 2022 Skysnow World Championships in  Sierra Nevada
 September 9 – 11: 2022 Skyrunning World Championships in  Ossola

Sled dog racing
 February 23 – 27: 2022 IFSS On-Snow World Championships in  Åsarna
 February 28 – March 4: 2022 IFSS/WSA Long Distance World Championship in  Särna
 March 10 – 12: 2022 Sleddog World Championship in  Östersund

Snowboarding

Softball
 November 26 – December 4: 2022 Men's Softball World Cup in

2022 Little League Baseball World Series
Men
Women

2022 Junior League Baseball World Series
Women

2022 Senior League Baseball World Series
Men
Women

Speed skating

2022 Winter Olympics
 February 5 – 19: Speed skating at the 2022 Winter Olympics in  Beijing
 Women's 3000 m winners: :  Irene Schouten, :  Francesca Lollobrigida, :  Isabelle Weidemann
 February 5 – 16: Short track speed skating at the 2022 Winter Olympics in  Beijing

Major competitions
 December 15 – 17, 2021: 2021 Four Continents Speed Skating Championships in  Calgary
 500 m winners:  Austin Kleba (m) /  Yekaterina Aydova (f)
 1000 m winners:  Denis Kuzin (m) /  Huang Yu-ting (f)
 1500 m winners:  Dmitry Morozov (m) /  Kali Christ (f)
 Mass Start winners:  Um Cheon-Ho (m) /  Park Chae-won (f)
 Men's 5000 m winner:  Ted-Jan Bloemen
 Women's 3000 m winner:  Jamie Jurak
 Team Pursuit winners:  (Ted-Jan Bloemen, Hayden Mayeur, Kaleb Müller, Jess Neufeld) (m) /  (Giorgia Birkeland, Jamie Jurak, Sarah Warren, Dessie Weigel) (f)
 Team Sprint winners:  (Austin Kleba, Brett Perry, Zach Stoppelmoor, Tanner Worley) (m) /  (Giorgia Birkeland, McKenzie Browne, Chrysta Rands, Sarah Warren) (f)
 January 7 – 9: 2022 European Speed Skating Championships in  Heerenveen
 500 m winners:  Piotr Michalski (m) /  Femke Kok (f)
 1000 m winners:  Thomas Krol (m) /  Jutta Leerdam (f)
 1500 m winners:  Kjeld Nuis (m) /  Antoinette de Jong (f)
 Men's 5000 m winner:  Patrick Roest
 Women's 3000 m winner:  Irene Schouten
 Mass Start winners:  Bart Swings (m) /  Irene Schouten (f)
 Team Pursuit winners:  (Sven Kramer, Marcel Bosker, Patrick Roest) (m) /  (Ireen Wüst, Antoinette de Jong, Irene Schouten, Marijke Groenewoud (reserve)) (f)
 Team Sprint winners:  (Merijn Scheperkamp, Kai Verbij, Tijmen Snel, Thomas Krol (reserve)) (m) /  (Andżelika Wójcik, Kaja Ziomek, Karolina Bosiek, Olga Kaczmarek (reserve))
 January 14 – 16: 2022 European Short Track Speed Skating Championships in  Dresden
 Competition cancelled.
 January 14 – 16: 2022 Four Continents Short Track Speed Skating Championships  Salt Lake City
 Competition cancelled.
 January 28 – 30: 2022 World Junior Speed Skating Championships in  Innsbruck
 500 m winners:  Joep Wennemars (m) /  Pien Smit (f)
 1000 m winners:  Joep Wennemars (m) /  Yukino Yoshida (f)
 1500 m winners:  Tim Prins (m) /  Jade Groenewoud (f)
 Mass Start winners:  Yang Ho-jun (m) /  Chloé Hoogendoorn (f)
 Men's 5000 m winner:  Sigurd Henriksen
 Women's 3000 m winner:  Jade Groenewoud
 Team Pursuit winners:  (Kotaro Kasahara, Issei Matsumoto, Shomu Sasaki) (m) /  (Jade Groenewoud, Chloé Hoogendoorn, Evelien Vijn) (f)
 Team Sprint winners:  (Sergei Bukuev, Nikita Proshin, Vsevolod Yatov) (m) /  (Jildou Hoekstra, Chloé Hoogendoorn, Pien Smit) (f)
 Overall winners:  Joep Wennemars (m) /  Jade Groenewoud (f)
 March 3 – 6: 2022 World Sprint Speed Skating Championships and 2022 World Allround Speed Skating Championships in  Hamar
 March 4 – 6: 2022 World Junior Short Track Speed Skating Championships in  Gdansk
 March 18 – 20: 2022 World Short Track Speed Skating Championships in  Montreal

2021–22 ISU Speed Skating World Cup
 November 12 – 14, 2021: WC #1 in  Tomaszów Mazowiecki
 1st 500 m winners:  Gao Tingyu (m) /  Erin Jackson (f)
 2st 500 m winners:  Tatsuya Shinhama (m) /  Erin Jackson (f)
 1000 m winners:  Hein Otterspeer (m) /  Brittany Bowe (f)
 1500 m winners:  Kim Min-seok (m) /  Miho Takagi (f)
 Mass Start winners:  Masahito Obayashi (m) /  Irene Schouten (f)
 Men's 5000 m winner:  Nils van der Poel
 Women's 3000 m winner:  Irene Schouten
 Team Pursuit winners:  (Sven Kramer, Patrick Roest, Marcel Bosker) (m) /  (Ivanie Blondin, Isabelle Weidemann, Valérie Maltais) (f)
 November 19 – 21, 2021: WC #2 in  Stavanger
 1st 500 m winners:  Laurent Dubreuil (m) /  Erin Jackson (f)
 2st 500 m winners:  Tatsuya Shinhama (m) /  Nao Kodaira (f)
 1000 m winners:  Thomas Krol (m) /  Brittany Bowe (f)
 1500 m winners:  Ning Zhongyan (m) /  Miho Takagi (f)
 Men's 10000 m winner:  Nils van der Poel
 Women's 5000 m winner:  Irene Schouten
 Team Sprint winners:  (Haotian Wang, Lian Ziwen, Ning Zhongyan, Haonan Du) (m) /  (Andżelika Wójcik, Kaja Ziomek, Natalia Czerwonka, Karolina Bosiek) (f)
 December 3 – 5, 2021: WC #3 in  Salt Lake City
 1st 500 m winners:  Yamato Matsui (m) /  Erin Jackson (f)
 2st 500 m winners:  Wataru Morishige (m) /  Andżelika Wójcik (f)
 1000 m winners:  Thomas Krol (m) /  Miho Takagi (f)
 1500 m winners:  Joey Mantia (m) /  Miho Takagi (f)
 Mass Start winners:  Bart Swings (m) /  Ivanie Blondin (f)
 Men's 5000 m winner:  Nils van der Poel
 Women's 3000 m winner:  Irene Schouten
 Team Pursuit winners:  (Joey Mantia, Emery Lehman, Casey Dawson) (m) /  (Valérie Maltais, Ivanie Blondin, Isabelle Weidemann, Alexa Scott) (f)
 December 10 – 12, 2021: WC #4 in  Calgary
 1st 500 m winners:  Laurent Dubreuil (m) /  Olga Fatkulina (f)
 2st 500 m winners:  Viktor Mushtakov (m) /  Angelina Golikova (f)
 1000 m winners:  Ning Zhongyan (m) /  Nao Kodaira (f)
 1500 m winners:  Joey Mantia (m) /  Brittany Bowe (f)
 Mass Start winners:  Albertus Hoolwerf (m) /  Francesca Lollobrigida (f)
 Men's 5000 m winner:  Nils van der Poel
 Women's 3000 m winner:  Francesca Lollobrigida
 Team Pursuit winners:  (Ethan Cepuran, Casey Dawson, Emery Lehman, Joey Mantia) (m) /  (Valérie Maltais, Ivanie Blondin, Isabelle Weidemann, Alexa Scott) (f)
 March 12 & 13: WC #5 in  Heerenveen (final)
 1st 500 m winners:  Tatsuya Shinhama (m) /  Erin Jackson (f)
 2st 500 m winners:  Tatsuya Shinhama (m) /  Erin Jackson (f)
 1000 m winners:  Kjeld Nuis (m) /  Miho Takagi (f)
 1500 m winners:  Kjeld Nuis (m) /  Miho Takagi (f)
 Mass Start winners:  Bart Swings (m) /  Irene Schouten (f)
 Men's 5000 m winner:  Nils van der Poel
 Women's 3000 m winner:  Irene Schouten

2021–22 ISU Short Track Speed Skating World Cup
 October 21 – 24, 2021: WC #1 in  Beijing
 500 m winners:  Shaolin Sándor Liu (m) /  Natalia Maliszewska (f)
 1000 m winners:  Hwang Dae-heon (m) /  Suzanne Schulting (f)
 1500 m winners:  Semion Elistratov (m) /  Lee Yu-bin (f)
 Men's 5000 m Relay winners:  (Itzhak de Laat, Sjinkie Knegt, Sven Roes, Jens van 't Wout)
 Women's 3000 m Relay winners:  (Fan Kexin, Guo Yihan, Qu Chunyu, Zhang Yuting)
 Mixed 2000 m Relay winners:  (Fan Kexin, Ren Ziwei, Wu Dajing, Zhang Yuting)
 October 28 – 31, 2021: WC #2 in  Nagoya
 500 m winners:  Hwang Dae-heon (m) /  Arianna Fontana (f)
 1000 m winners:  Ren Ziwei (m) /  Kristen Santos (f)
 1500 m winners:  Yuri Confortola (m) /  Suzanne Schulting (f)
 Men's 5000 m Relay winners:  (Pascal Dion, Steven Dubois, Charles Hamelin, Jordan Pierre-Gilles)
 Women's 3000 m Relay winners:  (Selma Poutsma, Suzanne Schulting, Yara van Kerkhof, Xandra Velzeboer, Rianne de Vries)
 Mixed 2000 m Relay winners:  (Ekaterina Efremenkova, Semion Elistratov, Sofia Prosvirnova, Pavel Sitnikov)
 November 18 – 21, 2021: WC #3 in  Debrecen
 500 m winners:  Shaolin Sándor Liu (m) /  Suzanne Schulting (f)
 1000 m winners:  Hwang Dae-heon (m) /  Suzanne Schulting (f)
 1500 m winners:  Ren Ziwei (m) /  Suzanne Schulting (f)
 Men's 5000 m Relay winners:  (Charles Hamelin, Maxime Laoun, Steven Dubois, Jordan Pierre-Gilles, Pascal Dion)
 Women's 3000 m Relay winners:  (Selma Poutsma, Suzanne Schulting, Yara van Kerkhof, Xandra Velzeboer, Rianne de Vries)
 Mixed 2000 m Relay winners:  (Qu Chunyu, Fan Kexin, Zhang Yuting, Wu Dajing, Ren Ziwei, Sun Long, Yu Songnan)
 November 25 – 28, 2021: WC #4 in  Dordrecht (final)
 500 m winners:  Wu Dajing (m) /  Kim Boutin (f)
 1000 m winners:  Shaoang Liu (m) /  Choi Min-jeong (f)
 1500 m winners:  Ren Ziwei (m) /  Lee Yu-bin (f)
 Men's 5000 m Relay winners:  (Kim Dong-wook, Kwak Yoon-Gy, Park In-wook, Park Jang-hyuk)
 Women's 3000 m Relay winners:  (Selma Poutsma, Suzanne Schulting, Yara van Kerkhof, Xandra Velzeboer, Rianne de Vries)
 Mixed 2000 m Relay winners:  (Sjinkie Knegt, Selma Poutsma, Suzanne Schulting, Jens Van 't Wout)

Speed skiing
 January 28 – 30: 2022 FIS Speed Skiing World Championships in  Vars
 Men's winners:  Simon Billy
 Women's winner:  Valentina Greggio

2022 Speed Skiing World Cup 
 February 11 & 12: WC #1 in  Salla
 Men's winner:  Simone Origone (2 times)
 Women's winner:  Valentina Greggio (2 times)
 March 10 – 12: WC #2 in  Idrefjäll
 Men's winners:  Simon Billy (1st and 2nd) /  Bastien Montès (3rd)
 Women's winner:  Valentina Greggio (3 times)
 March 31 – April 2: WC #3 in  Grandvalira/Grau Roig
 Men's winner:  Simone Origone (2 times)
 Women's winner:  Valentina Greggio (2 times)
 World Cup winners:  Simone Origone (m) /  Valentina Greggio (f)

Sport climbing

2022 IFSC Climbing World Cup
 April 8 – 10: WC #1 in  Meiringen
 Boulder winners:  Tomoa Narasaki (m) /  Janja Garnbret (f)
 May 6 – 8: WC #2 in  Seoul
 Boulder winners:  Kokoro Fujii (m) /  Natalia Grossman (f)
 Speed winners:  Veddriq Leonardo (m) /  Aleksandra Mirosław (f)
 May 20 – 22: WC #3 in  Salt Lake City
 Boulder winners:  Mejdi Schalck (m) /  Natalia Grossman (f)
 Speed winners:  Kiromal Katibin (m) /  Aleksandra Mirosław (f)
 May 27 – 29: WC #4 in  Salt Lake City
 Boulder winners:  Yoshiyuki Ogata (m) /  Natalia Grossman (f)
 Speed winners:  Veddriq Leonardo (m) /  Aleksandra Mirosław (f)
 June 10 - 12: WC #5 in  Brixen
 Boulder winners:  Yannick Flohé (m) /  Natalia Grossman (f)
 June 22 – 25: WC #6 in  Innsbruck
 Boulder winners:  Colin Duffy (m) /  Natalia Grossman (f)
 Lead winners:  Colin Duffy (m) /  Janja Garnbret (f)
 June 30 – July 2: WC #7 in  Villars
 Lead winners:  Taisei Homma (m) /  Janja Garnbret (f)
 Speed winners:  Long Jianguo (m) /  Deng Lijuan (f)
 July 8 - 10: WC #8 in  Chamonix
 Lead winners:  Adam Ondra (m) /  Janja Garnbret (f)
 Speed winners:  Long Jinbao (m) /  Deng Lijuan (f)
 July 22 - 23: WC #9 in  Briançon
 Lead winners:  Jesse Grupper (m) /  Janja Garnbret (f)
 September 2 - 3: WC #10 in  Koper
 Lead winners:  Luka Potočar (m) /  Ai Mori (f)
 September 9 - 11: WC #11 in  Edinburgh
 Lead winners:  Jesse Grupper (m) /  Ai Mori (f)
 Speed winners:  Samuel Watson (m) /  Aleksandra Kałucka (f)
 September 24 - 26: WC #12 in  Jakarta
 Lead winners:  Ao Yurikusa (m) /  Janja Garnbret (f)
 Speed winners:  Aspar Aspar (m) /  Deng Lijuan (f)
 October 20 - 22: WC #13 in  Morioka
 Combined (boulder & lead) winners:  Tomoa Narasaki (m) /  Ai Mori (f)

Sport fishing

Fly fishing
 September 25 – October 2: 2022 Fly Fishing World Championship in  Asturias

Fresh water
 February 19 & 20: 2022 Ice Fishing World Championship in  Šiauliai
 Individual:   Aliaksei Yudzenkou,   Pavlo Khvas,   Deividas Račkauskas.
 April 30 & May 1: 2022 Carnivorous Artificial Baits Shore Fishing World Championship in  Campobasso
 Individual:   Bruno Mariano Spino,   Luca Benedetti,   Valentino Vidrasc.
 May 28 & 29: 2022 Trout Fishing with Natural Baits World Championship in  Pont-de-Chéruy
 July 9 & 10: 2022 Feeder Fishing World Championship for Nations in  Kyiv
 August 20 & 21: 2022 Coarse Angling World Championship for Ladies in  Coudekerque-Branche
 August 31 – September 3: 2022 Carp Fishing World Championship for Ladies in  Oxford
 September 10 & 11: 2022 Coarse Angling World Championship for Nations in  Osijek
 September 21 – 24: 2022 Carp Fishing World Championship in  Prylbychi
 September 24 & 25: 2022 Carnivorous Artificial Baits Kayaks Fishing World Championship in  Torre de Moncorvo
 October 6 – 8: 2022 Carnivorous Artificial Baits Boats Fishing World Championship in  Orzysz
 October 20 – 22: 2022 Black-Bass Fishing World Championship in  Columbia
 November 5 & 6: 2022 Trout Area Fishing World Championship
 November 19 & 20: 2022 Street Fishing World Championship in  Ghent
 December 3 & 4: 2022 Feeder Free Style Method Fishing World Championship in  Bloemhof Dam

Sea
 May 28 – June 4: 2022 Shore Angling Pair Angling World Championship in  Mimizan
 Individual:   Frédéric Joubert & Jonathan Selleslagh,   William Buckley & Michael McLoughlin,   Fabian Frenzel & Sebastian Lucklum.
 September 10 – 17: 2022 Big Game Fishing World Championship in  Pescara
 September 24 – October 1: 2022 Boat Angling World Championship in  Albufeira
 November 19 – 26: 2022 Shore Angling World Championship in  Hammamet
 TBC: 2022 Long Casting of Sea Weights World Championship in

Squash

 May 13 – 22: 2022 PSA Men's World Squash Championship in  Cairo
  Ali Farag def.  Mohamed El Shorbagy, 9–11, 11–8, 7–11, 11–9, 11–2.
 May 13 – 22: 2022 PSA Women's World Squash Championship in  Cairo
  Nour El Sherbini def.  Nouran Gohar, 7–11, 11–7, 11–8, 11–7.

2021–22 PSA World Tour
Gold
 September 23 – 27, 2021: Oracle Netsuite Open in  San Francisco
 Men's:  Ali Farag def.  Paul Coll, 9–11, 12–10, 11–8, 11–8.
 Women's:  Amanda Sobhy def.  Salma Hany, 11–7, 11–8, 11–4.
 November 14 – 19, 2021: Canary Wharf Classic in  London
 Men's:  Paul Coll def.  Ali Farag, 7–11, 13–11, 11–5, 11–6.
 December 12 – 20, 2021: CIB Black Ball Squash Open in  Cairo
 Women's:  Nour El Sherbini def.  Hania El Hammamy, 11–7, 9–11, 11–1, 11–7.
 December 16 – 20, 2021: CIB Black Ball Squash Open in  Cairo
 Men's:  Paul Coll def.  Ali Farag, 11–7, 11–5, 13–11.
 January 4 – 9: Houston Open in  Houston
 Men's:  Ali Farag def.  Mazen Hesham, 11–6, 8–11, 11–7, 11–3.
 March 6 – 11: OptAsia Championships in  London
 Men's:  Ali Farag def.  Diego Elías, 4–11, 11–8, 11–8, 13–11.
 March 13 – 18: GillenMarkets Canary Wharf Classic in  London
 Men's:  Fares Dessouky def.  Mostafa Asal, 11–5, 13–11, 12–10.
 May 1 – 7: J.P. Morgan Tournament of Champions in  New York City
 Men's:  Ali Farag def.  Diego Elías, 16–14, 9–11, 11–9, 11–5.
 Women's:  Nouran Gohar def.  Amanda Sobhy, 11–7, 11–7, 11–3.
 June 7 – 11: Necker Mauritius Open in  Forbach
 Men's:  Diego Elías def.  Mohamed El Shorbagy, 11–2, 11–9, 11–8.

Silver
 August 9 – 13, 2021: Manchester Open in  Manchester
 Men's:  Diego Elías def.  Joel Makin, 12–10, 11–6, 11–6.
 Women's:  Hania El Hammamy def.  Sarah-Jane Perry, 11–5, 11–9, 11–7.
 January 26 – 30: Sturbridge Capital Motor City Open in  Bloomfield Hills
 Men's:  Diego Elías def.  Fares Dessouky, 11–5, 11–8, 11–9.
 April 13 – 18: Manchester Open in  Manchester
 Men's:  Joel Makin def.  Mohamed El Shorbagy, 11–7, 5–11, 13–11, 11–4.
 Women's:  Joelle King def.  Sarah-Jane Perry, 11–8, 11–9, 11–8.

Bronze
 October 19 – 23, 2021: DAC Pro Squash Classic in  Detroit
 Women's:  Nouran Gohar def.  Georgina Kennedy, 11–8, 11–6, 11–1.
 November 23 – 27, 2021: Malaysian Open in  Kuala Lumpur
 Men's:  Saurav Ghosal def.  Miguel Ángel Rodríguez, 11–7, 11–8, 13–11.
 Women's:  Aifa Azman def.  Salma Hany, 12–10, 11–8, 11–4.
 January 27 – 31: Cleveland Classic in  Pepper Pike
 Women's:  Georgina Kennedy def.  Sarah-Jane Perry, 11–7, 6–11, 11–2, 11–6.
 February 2 – 6: Gaynor Cincinnati Cup in  Detroit
 Women's:  Nouran Gohar def.  Olivia Fiechter, 11–6, 11–3, 11–8.
 February 16 – 20: Squash on Fire Open in  Washington, D.C.
 Men's:  Mohamed El Shorbagy def.  Joel Makin, 11–5, 11–9, 11–18.
 Women's:  Nour El Sherbini def.  Joelle King, 6–11, 11–8, 16–14, 13–11.
 March 15 – 19: Karachi Open Squash Championships in  Karachi
 Men's:  Karim Abdel Gawad def.  Youssef Soliman, 11–5, 11–9, 11–6.
 April 20 – 24: Carol Weymuller Open in  New York City
 Women's:  Rowan Elaraby def.  Sivasangari Subramaniam, 11–7, 6–11, 11–9, 11–6.

Platinum
 August 16 – 22, 2021: Allam British Open in  Hull
 Men's:  Paul Coll def.  Ali Farag, 6–11, 11–6, 11–6, 11–8.
 Women's:  Nour El Sherbini def.  Nouran Gohar, 9–11, 13–11, 5–11, 11–7, 11–2.
 September 10 – 17, 2021: CIB Egyptian Open in  Cairo
 Men's:  Ali Farag def.  Mohamed El Shorbagy, 6–11, 9–11, 11–2, 11–6, 11–5.
 Women's:  Nouran Gohar def.  Nour El Sherbini, 11–7, 11–4, 5–11, 7–11, 12–10.
 October 1 – 6, 2021: U.S. Open in  Philadelphia
 Men's:  Mostafa Asal def.  Tarek Momen, 5–11, 5–11, 11–9, 12–10, 11–3.
 Women's:  Nouran Gohar def.  Hania El Hammamy, 9–11, 11–9, 11–7, 11–3.
 October 17 – 23, 2021: Qatar Classic in  Doha
 Men's:  Diego Elías def.  Paul Coll, 13–11, 5–11, 13–11, 11–9.
 February 23 – March 2: Windy City Open in  Chicago
 Men's:  Paul Coll def.  Youssef Ibrahim, 7–11, 10–12, 11–4, 11–7, 11–9.
 Women's:  Nouran Gohar def.  Hania El Hammamy, 15–13, 11–9, 11–8.
 March 12 – 17: CIB Black Ball Squash Open in  Cairo
 Women's:  Nouran Gohar def.  Nour El Sherbini, 17–15, 11–8, 2–0, rtd.
 March 28 – April 3: Allam British Open in  Hull
 Men's:  Paul Coll def.  Ali Farag, 12–10, 11–6, 11–4.
 Women's:  Hania El Hammamy def.  Nouran Gohar, 11–9, 11–7, 8–11, 11–4.
 May 27 – June 3: El Gouna international in  El Gouna
 Men's:  Mostafa Asal def.  Paul Coll, 11–8, 11–9, 11–5.
 Women's:  Hania El Hammamy def.  Nouran Gohar, 11–2, 11–4, 8–11, 9–11, 11–4.

2021–22 PSA World Tour Finals
 Men's:  Mostafa Asal def.  Paul Coll, 13–11, 11–8, 11–7.
 Women's:  Nour El Sherbini def.  Nouran Gohar, 11–6, 11–8, 11–5.

Surfing

2022 World Surf League
 January 29 – February 10: Billabong Pipeline Masters in  Oahu
 Winners:  Kelly Slater (m) /  Moana Jones Wong (f)
 February 11 – 23: Hurley Pro Sunset Beach in  Oahu
 Winners:  Barron Mamiya (m) /  Brisa Hennessy (f)
 March 3 – 13: MEO Pro Portugal in  Peniche
 Winners:  Griffin Colapinto (m) /  Tatiana Weston-Webb (f)
 April 10 – 20: Rip Curl Pro Bells Beach in  Bells Beach
 Winners:  Filipe Toledo (m) /  Tyler Wright (f)
 April 24 – May 4: Margaret River Pro in  Margaret River
 Winners:  Jack Robinson (m) /  Isabella Nichols (f)
 May 28 – June 6: Quiksilver Pro G-Land in  G-Land
 Winners:  Jack Robinson (m) /  Johanne Defay (f)

2022 World Surf Challenger Series
 May 7 – 15: Gold Coast in  Gold Coast

Synchronized skating
 April 7 – 9: 2022 ISU World Synchronized Skating Championships in  Hamilton
 Final placements: :  Les Suprêmes, :  Marigold IceUnity, :  Rockettes

Table tennis

 September 30 – October 9: 2022 World Table Tennis Team Championships in  Chengdu

2022 WTT Feeder
 January 10 – 15: WTT Feeder Düsseldorf I in  Düsseldorf
 Men's singles:  Robert Gardos def.  Brian Afanador, 4–1 (11–9, 11–8, 11–7, 5–11, 11–9).
 Women's singles:  Barbora Balážová def.  Shan Xiaona, 4–3 (13–11, 11–5, 5–11, 8–11, 11–3, 11–13, 11–4).
 Men's doubles:  Félix Lebrun &  Esteban Dorr def.  Diogo Chen &  Florian Bourrassaud, 3–1 (11–8, 4–11, 11–9, 11–7).
 Women's doubles:  Hana Arapović &  Polina Trifonova def.  Ivana Malobabić &  Mateja Jeger, 3–0 (walkover).
 January 17 – 23: WTT Feeder Düsseldorf II in  Düsseldorf
 Men's singles:  Patrick Franziska def.  Ovidiu Ionescu, 4–0 (11–5, 11–6, 11–9, 11–8).
 Women's singles:  Elizabet Abraamian def.  Amelie Solja, 4–3, (11–13, 7–11, 11–7, 8–11, 11–6, 11–5, 11–8).
 Men's doubles:  Alexis Lebrun &  Félix Lebrun def.  Ovidiu Ionescu &  Álvaro Robles, 3–1 (11–7, 11–6, 10–12, 11–7).
 Women's doubles:  Chantal Mantz &  Yuan Wan def.  Giorgia Piccolin &  Debora Vivarelli, 3–0 (11–7, 11–4, 11–9).
 Mixed doubles:  Dimitrije Levajac &  Izabela Lupulesku def.  John Oyebode &  Gaia Monfardini, 3–2 (11–8, 8–11, 11–5, 6–11, 11–5).
 February 27 – March 5: WTT Feeder Muscat in  Muscat

2022 WTT Youth Star Contender
 January 31 – February 6: Youth Star Contender #1 in  Tunis
 U19 singles winners:  Alexis Lebrun (m) /  Elena Zaharia (f)
 U15 singles winners:  Samuel Arpáš (m) /   Anastasiia Ivanova (f)
 U19 doubles winners:  Louis Laffineur &  Adrien Rassenfosse (m) /  Vlada Voronina &  Lyubov Tenser (f)
 U15 doubles winners:  Tiago Abiodun &  Flavien Coton (m) /  María Berzosa &  Mariana Santa Comba (f)
 February 14 – 20: Youth Star Contender #2 in  Spa
 February 14 – 20: Youth Star Contender #3 in  Metz
 February 26 – March 4: Youth Star Contender #4 in  Vila Real

ETTU
 January 12 – TBD: European Champions League (Men's and Women's)
 January 12 – TBD: ETTU Cup (Men's and Women's)
 January 28 – TBD: ETTU Europe Trophy

Taekwondo

 April 21 – 24: 2022 World Taekwondo Poomsae Championships in  Goyang
 May 19 – 22: 2022 European Taekwondo Championships and 2022 Para-European Taekwondo Championships in  Manchester

Telemark skiing

Tennis

Grand Slam
January 17 – 30: 2022 Australian Open
 Men's singles:  Rafael Nadal def.  Daniil Medvedev, 2–6, 6–7(5–7), 6–4, 6–4, 7–5.
 Men's doubles:  Thanasi Kokkinakis &  Nick Kyrgios def.  Matthew Ebden &  Max Purcell, 7–5, 6–4
 Women's singles:  Ashleigh Barty def.  Danielle Collins, 6–3, 7–6(7–2)
 Women's doubles:  Barbora Krejčíková &  Kateřina Siniaková def.  Anna Danilina &  Beatriz Haddad Maia, 6–7(3–7), 6–4, 6–4
 Mixed doubles:  Kristina Mladenovic &  Ivan Dodig def.  Jaimee Fourlis &  Jason Kubler, 6–3, 6–4
May 29 – June 11: 2022 French Open
 Men's singles:  Rafael Nadal def.  Casper Ruud, 6–3, 6–3, 6–0.
 Men's doubles:  Marcelo Arévalo &  Jean-Julien Rojer def.  Ivan Dodig &  Austin Krajicek , 6–7(4–7), 7–6(7–5), 6–3.
 Women's singles:  Iga Świątek def.  Coco Gauff, 6–1, 6–3.
 Women's doubles:  Caroline Garcia &  Kristina Mladenovic def.  Coco Gauff &  Jessica Pegula, 2–6, 6–3, 6–2.
 Mixed doubles:  Ena Shibahara &  Wesley Koolhof def.  Ulrikke Eikeri &  Joran Vliegen, 7–6(7–5), 6–2. 
June 27 – July 10: 2022 Wimbledon Championships
 Men's singles:  Novak Djokovic def.  Nick Kyrgios, 4–6, 6–3, 6–4, 7–6(7–3).
 Men's doubles:  Matthew Ebden &  Max Purcell def.  Nikola Mektić &  Mate Pavić , 7–6(7–5), 6–7(3–7), 4–6, 6–4, 7–6(10–2).
 Women's singles:  Elena Rybakina def.  Ons Jabeur, 3–6, 6–2, 6–2.
 Women's doubles:  Barbora Krejčiková &  Kateřina Siniaková def.  Elise Mertens &  Zhang Shuai, 6–2, 6–4.
 Mixed doubles:  Neal Skupski &  Desirae Krawczyk def.  Matthew Ebden &  Samantha Stosur, 6–4, 6–3.
August 28 – September 11: 2022 U.S. Open
 Men's singles:  Carlos Alcaraz def.  Casper Ruud, 6–4, 2–6, 7–6(7–1), 6–3.
 Men's doubles:  Rajeev Ram &  Joe Salisbury def.  Wesley Koolhof &  Neal Skupski, 7–6(7–4), 7–5.
 Women's singles:  Iga Świątek def.  Ons Jabeur, 6–2, 7–6(7–5).
 Women's doubles:  Barbora Krejčíková and  Kateřina Siniaková def.  Caty McNally &  Taylor Townsend, 3–6, 7–5, 6–1.
 Mixed doubles:  Storm Sanders &  John Peers def.  Kirsten Flipkens &  Édouard Roger-Vasselin, 4–6, 6–4, [10–7].

2022 ATP Tour
ATP Tour Masters 1000
 March 7 – 20: 2022 BNP Paribas Open in  Indian Wells
 Singles:  Taylor Fritz def.  Rafael Nadal, 6–3, 7–6(7–5).
 Doubles:  John Isner &  Jack Sock def.  Wesley Koolhof &  Neal Skupski, 7–6(7–5), 6–4.
 March 21 – April 3: 2022 Miami Open in  Miami Gardens
 Singles:  Carlos Alcaraz def.  Casper Ruud, 7–5, 6–4.
 Doubles:  Hubert Hurkacz &  John Isner def.  Santiago González &  Édouard Roger-Vasselin, 7–6(7–4), 6–3.
 April 10 – 17: 2022 Monte-Carlo Masters in  Monte Carlo
 Singles:  Stefanos Tsitsipas def.  Alejandro Davidovich Fokina, 6–3, 7–6(7–3).
 Doubles:  Rajeev Ram &  Joe Salisbury def.  Juan Sebastián Cabal &  Robert Farah, 6–4, 3–6, [10–7].
 May 2 – 8: 2022 Mutua Madrid Open in  Madrid
 Singles:  Carlos Alcaraz def.  Alexander Zverev, 6–3, 6–1.
 Doubles:  Wesley Koolhof &  Neal Skupski def.  Juan Sebastián Cabal &  Robert Farah, 6–7(4–7), 6–4, [10–5].
 May 9 – 15: 2022 Italian Open in  Rome
 Singles:  Novak Djokovic def.  Stefanos Tsitsipas, 6–0, 7–6(7–5).
 Doubles:  Nikola Mektić &  Mate Pavić def.  John Isner &  Diego Schwartzman, 6–2, 6–7(6–8), [12–10].

ATP Tour 500
 February 7 – 13: 2022 ABN AMRO World Tennis Tournament in  Rotterdam
 Singles:  Félix Auger-Aliassime def.  Stefanos Tsitsipas, 6–4, 6–2.
 Doubles:  Robin Haase &  Matwé Middelkoop def.  Lloyd Harris &  Tim Pütz, 4–6, 7–6(7–5), [10–5].
 February 14 – 20: 2022 Rio Open in  Rio de Janeiro
 Singles:  Carlos Alcaraz def.  Diego Schwartzman, 6–4, 6–2.
 Doubles:  Simone Bolelli &  Fabio Fognini def.  Jamie Murray &  Bruno Soares, 7–5, 6–7(2–7), [10–6].
 February 21 – 26: 2022 Dubai Tennis Championships in  Dubai
 Singles:  Andrey Rublev def.  Jiří Veselý, 6–3, 6–4.
 Doubles:  Tim Pütz &  Michael Venus def.  Nikola Mektić &  Mate Pavić, 6–3, 6–7(5–7), [16–14].
 February 21 – 27: 2022 Abierto Mexicano Telcel in  Acapulco
 Singles:  Rafael Nadal def.  Cameron Norrie, 6–4, 6–4.
 Doubles:  Feliciano López &  Stefanos Tsitsipas def.  Marcelo Arévalo &  Jean-Julien Rojer, 7–5, 6–4.
 April 18 – 24: 2022 Barcelona Open Banc Sabadell in  Barcelona
 Singles:  Carlos Alcaraz def.  Pablo Carreño Busta, 6–3, 6–2.
 Doubles:  Kevin Krawietz &  Andreas Mies def.  Wesley Koolhof &  Neal Skupski, 6–7(3–7), 7–6(7–5), [10–6].

ATP Tour 250
 January 3 – 9: 2022 Adelaide International 1 in  Adelaide
 Singles:  Gaël Monfils def.  Karen Khachanov, 6–4, 6–4.
 Doubles:  Rohan Bopanna &  Ramkumar Ramanathan def.  Ivan Dodig &  Marcelo Melo, 7–6(8–6), 6–1.
 January 3 – 9: 2022 Melbourne Summer Set in  Melbourne
 Singles:  Rafael Nadal def.  Maxime Cressy, 7–6(8–6), 6–3.
 Doubles:  Wesley Koolhof &  Neal Skupski def.  Aleksandr Nedovyesov &  Aisam-ul-Haq Qureshi, 6–4, 6–4.
 January 10 – 16: 2022 Adelaide International 2 in  Adelaide
 Singles:  Thanasi Kokkinakis def.  Arthur Rinderknech, 6–7(6–8), 7–6(7–5), 6–3.
 Doubles:  Wesley Koolhof &  Neal Skupski def.  Ariel Behar &  Gonzalo Escobar, 7–6(7–5), 6–4.
 January 10 – 16: 2022 Sydney International in  Sydney
 Singles:  Aslan Karatsev def.  Andy Murray, 6–3, 6–3.
 Doubles:  John Peers &  Filip Polášek def.  Simone Bolelli &  Fabio Fognini, 7–5, 7–5.
 January 31 – February 6: 2022 Open Sud de France in  Montpellier
 Singles:  Alexander Bublik def.  Alexander Zverev, 6–4, 6–3.
 Doubles:  Pierre-Hugues Herbert &  Nicolas Mahut def.  Lloyd Glasspool &  Harri Heliövaara, 4–6, 7–6(7–3), [12–10].
 January 31 – February 6: 2022 Maharashtra Open in  Pune
 Singles:  João Sousa def.  Emil Ruusuvuori, 7–6(11–9), 4–6, 6–1.
 Doubles:  Rohan Bopanna &  Ramkumar Ramanathan def.  Luke Saville &  John-Patrick Smith, 6–7(10–12), 6–3, [10–6].
 January 31 – February 6: 2022 Córdoba Open in  Córdoba
 Singles:  Albert Ramos Viñolas def.  Alejandro Tabilo, 4–6, 6–3, 6–4.
 Doubles:  Santiago González &  Andrés Molteni def.  Andrej Martin &  Tristan-Samuel Weissborn, 7–5, 6–3.
 February 7 – 13: 2022 Argentina Open in  Buenos Aires
 Singles:  Casper Ruud def.  Diego Schwartzman, 5–7, 6–2, 6–3.
 Doubles:  Santiago González &  Andrés Molteni def.  Fabio Fognini &  Horacio Zeballos, 6–1, 6–1.
 February 7 – 13: 2022 Dallas Open in  Dallas
 Singles:  Reilly Opelka def.  Jenson Brooksby, 7–6(7–5), 7–6(7–3).
 Doubles:  Marcelo Arévalo &  Jean-Julien Rojer def.  Lloyd Glasspool &  Harri Heliövaara, 7–6(7–4), 6–4.
 February 14 – 19: 2022 Qatar ExxonMobil Open in  Doha
 Singles:  Roberto Bautista Agut def.  Nikoloz Basilashvili, 6–3, 6–4.
 Doubles:  Wesley Koolhof &  Neal Skupski def.  Rohan Bopanna &  Denis Shapovalov, 7–6(7–4), 6–1.
 February 14 – 20: 2022 Delray Beach Open in  Delray Beach
 Singles:  Cameron Norrie def.  Reilly Opelka, 7–6(7–1), 7–6(7–4).
 Doubles:  Marcelo Arévalo &  Jean-Julien Rojer def.  Aleksandr Nedovyesov &  Aisam-ul-Haq Qureshi, 6–2, 6–7(5–7), [10–4].
 February 14 – 20: 2022 Open 13 in  Marseille
 Singles:  Andrey Rublev def.  Félix Auger-Aliassime, 7–5, 7–6(7–4).
 Doubles:  Denys Molchanov &  Andrey Rublev def.  Raven Klaasen &  Ben McLachlan, 4–6, 7–5, [10–7].
 February 21 – 27: 2022 Chile Open in  Santiago
 Singles:  Pedro Martínez def.  Sebastián Báez, 4–6, 6–4, 6–4.
 Doubles:  Rafael Matos &  Felipe Meligeni Alves def.  André Göransson &  Nathaniel Lammons, 7–6(10–8), 7–6(7–3).
 April 4 – 10: 2022 U.S. Men's Clay Court Championships in  Houston
 Singles:  Reilly Opelka def.  John Isner, 6–3, 7–6(9–7).
 Doubles:  Matthew Ebden &  Max Purcell def.  Ivan Sabanov &  Matej Sabanov, 6–3, 6–3.
 April 4 – 10: 2022 Grand Prix Hassan II in  Marrakesh
 Singles:  David Goffin def.  Alex Molčan, 3–6, 6–3, 6–3.
 Doubles:  Rafael Matos &  David Vega Hernández def.  Andrea Vavassori &  Jan Zieliński, 6–1, 7–5.
 April 18 – 24: 2022 Serbia Open in  Belgrade
 Singles:  Andrey Rublev def.  Novak Djokovic, 6–2, 6–7(4–7), 6–0.
 Doubles:  Ariel Behar &  Gonzalo Escobar def.  Nikola Mektić &  Mate Pavić, 6–2, 3–6, [10–6].
 April 25 – May 1: 2022 Estoril Open in  Cascais
 Singles:  Sebastián Báez def.  Frances Tiafoe, 6–3, 6–2.
 Doubles:  Nuno Borges &  Francisco Cabral def.  Máximo González &  André Göransson, 6–2, 6–3.
 April 25 – May 1: 2022 BMW Open in  Munich
 Singles:  Holger Rune def.  Botic van de Zandschulp, 3–4, ret.
 Doubles:  Kevin Krawietz &  Andreas Mies def.  Rafael Matos &  David Vega Hernández, 4–6, 6–4, [10–7].
 May 16 – 21: 2022 Geneva Open in  Geneva
 Singles:  Casper Ruud def.  João Sousa, 7–6(7–3), 4–6, 7–6(7–1).
 Doubles:  Nikola Mektić &  Mate Pavić def.  Pablo Andújar &  Matwé Middelkoop, 2–6, 6–2, [10–3].
 May 16 – 21: 2022 ATP Lyon Open in  Lyon
 Singles:  Cameron Norrie def.  Alex Molčan, 6–3, 6–7(3–7), 6–1.
 Doubles:  Ivan Dodig &  Austin Krajicek def.  Máximo González &  Marcelo Melo, 6–3, 6–4.

Teams
 January 1 – 9: 2022 ATP Cup in  Sydney
 In the final,  def. , 2–0.

2022 WTA Tour
WTA 1000
 February 21 – 27: 2022 Qatar Total Open in  Doha
 Singles:  Iga Świątek def.  Anett Kontaveit, 6–2, 6–0.
 Doubles:  Coco Gauff &  Jessica Pegula def.  Veronika Kudermetova &  Elise Mertens, 3–6, 7–5, [10–5].
 March 7 – 20: 2022 BNP Paribas Open in  Indian Wells
 Singles:  Iga Świątek def.  Maria Sakkari, 6–4, 6–1.
 Doubles:  Xu Yifan &  Yang Zhaoxuan def.  Asia Muhammad &  Ena Shibahara, 7–5, 7–6(7–4).
 March 22 – April 3: 2022 Miami Open in  Miami Gardens
 Singles:  Iga Świątek def.  Naomi Osaka, 6–4, 6–0.
 Doubles:  Laura Siegemund &  Vera Zvonareva def.  Veronika Kudermetova &  Elise Mertens, 7–6(7–3), 7–5.
 April 25 – May 8: 2022 Mutua Madrid Open in  Madrid
 Singles:  Ons Jabeur def.  Jessica Pegula, 7–5, 0–6, 6–2.
 Doubles:  Gabriela Dabrowski &  Giuliana Olmos def.  Desirae Krawczyk &  Demi Schuurs, 7–6(7–1), 5–7, [10–7].
 May 9 – 15: 2022 Italian Open in  Rome
 Singles:  Iga Świątek def.  Ons Jabeur, 6–2, 6–2.
 Doubles:  Veronika Kudermetova &  Anastasia Pavlyuchenkova def.  Gabriela Dabrowski &  Giuliana Olmos, 1–6, 6–4, [10–7].

WTA 500
 January 4 – 9: 2022 Adelaide International 1 in  Adelaide
 Singles:  Ashleigh Barty def.  Elena Rybakina, 6–3, 6–2.
 Doubles:  Ashleigh Barty &  Storm Sanders def.  Darija Jurak &  Andreja Klepač, 6–1, 6–4.
 January 10 – 16: 2022 Sydney International in  Sydney
 Singles:  Paula Badosa def.  Barbora Krejčíková, 6–3, 4–6, 7–6(7–4).
 Doubles:  Anna Danilina &  Beatriz Haddad Maia def.  Vivian Heisen &  Panna Udvardy, 4–6, 7–5, [10–8].
 February 6 – 13: 2022 St. Petersburg Ladies' Trophy in  Saint Petersburg
 Singles:  Anett Kontaveit def.  Maria Sakkari, 5–7, 7–6(7–4), 7–5.
 Doubles:  Anna Kalinskaya &  Caty McNally def.  Alicja Rosolska &  Erin Routliffe, 6–3, 7–6(7–5), [10–4].
 February 14 – 19: 2022 Dubai Tennis Championships in  Dubai
 Singles:  Jeļena Ostapenko def.  Veronika Kudermetova, 6–0, 6–4.
 Doubles:  Veronika Kudermetova &  Elise Mertens def.  Lyudmyla Kichenok &  Jeļena Ostapenko, 6–1, 6–3.
 April 4 – 10: 2022 Charleston Open in  Charleston
 Singles:  Belinda Bencic def.  Ons Jabeur, 6–1, 5–7, 6–4.
 Doubles:  Andreja Klepač &  Magda Linette def.  Lucie Hradecká &  Sania Mirza, 6–2, 4–6, [10–7].
 April 18 – 24: 2022 Porsche Tennis Grand Prix in  Stuttgart
 Singles:  Iga Świątek def.  Aryna Sabalenka, 6–2, 6–2.
 Doubles:  Desirae Krawczyk &  Demi Schuurs def.  Coco Gauff &  Zhang Shuai, 6–3, 6–4.

WTA 250
 January 4 – 9: 2022 Melbourne Summer Set 1 in  Melbourne
 Singles:  Simona Halep def.  Veronika Kudermetova, 6–2, 6–3.
 Doubles:  Asia Muhammad &  Jessica Pegula def.  Sara Errani &  Jasmine Paolini, 6–3, 6–1.
 January 4 – 9: 2022 Melbourne Summer Set 2 in  Melbourne
 Singles:  Amanda Anisimova def.  Aliaksandra Sasnovich, 7–5, 1–6, 6–4.
 Doubles:  Bernarda Pera &  Kateřina Siniaková def.  Tereza Martincová &  Mayar Sherif, 6–2, 6–7(7–9), [10–5].
 January 10 – 16: 2022 Adelaide International 2 in  Adelaide
 Singles:  Madison Keys def.  Alison Riske, 6–1, 6–2.
 Doubles:  Eri Hozumi &  Makoto Ninomiya def.  Tereza Martincová &  Markéta Vondroušová, 1–6, 7–6(7–4), [10–7].
 February 21 – 27: 2022 Abierto Zapopan in  Guadalajara
 Singles:  Sloane Stephens def.  Marie Bouzková, 7–5, 1–6, 6–2.
 Doubles:  Kaitlyn Christian &  Lidziya Marozava def.  Wang Xinyu &  Zhu Lin, 7–5, 6–3.
 February 28 – March 6: 2022 WTA Lyon Open in  Lyon
 Singles:  Zhang Shuai def.  Dayana Yastremska, 3–6, 6–3, 6–4.
 Doubles:  Laura Siegemund &  Vera Zvonareva def.  Alicia Barnett &  Olivia Nicholls, 7–5, 6–1.
 February 28 – March 6: 2022 Monterrey Open in  Monterrey
 Singles:  Leylah Fernandez def.  Camila Osorio, 6–7(5–7), 6–4, 7–6(7–3).
 Doubles:  Catherine Harrison &  Sabrina Santamaria def.  Han Xinyun &  Yana Sizikova, 1–6, 7–5, [10–6].
 April 4 – 10: 2022 Copa Colsanitas in  Bogotá
 Singles:  Tatjana Maria def.  Laura Pigossi, 6–3, 4–6, 6–2.
 Doubles:  Astra Sharma &  Aldila Sutjiadi def.  Emina Bektas &  Tara Moore, 4–6, 6–4, [11–9].
 April 18 – 24: 2022 İstanbul Cup in  Istanbul
 Singles:  Anastasia Potapova def.  Veronika Kudermetova, 6–3, 6–1.
 Doubles:  Marie Bouzková &  Sara Sorribes Tormo def.  Natela Dzalamidze &  Kamilla Rakhimova, 6–3, 6–4.
 May 16 – 21: 2022 Grand Prix SAR La Princesse Lalla Meryem in  Rabat
 Singles:  Martina Trevisan def.  Claire Liu, 6–2, 6–1.
 Doubles:  Eri Hozumi &  Makoto Ninomiya def.  Monica Niculescu &  Alexandra Panova, 6–7(7–9), 6–3, [10–8].
 May 16 – 21: 2022 Internationaux de Strasbourg in  Strasbourg
 Singles:  Angelique Kerber def.  Kaja Juvan, 7–6(7–5), 6–7(0–7), 7–6(7–5).
 Doubles:  Nicole Melichar-Martinez &  Daria Saville def.  Lucie Hradecká &  Sania Mirza, 5–7, 7–5, [10–6].

2022 ATP Challenger Tour
Challenger 80
 January 3 – 9: 2022 Bendigo International in  Bendigo
 Singles:  Ernesto Escobedo def.  Enzo Couacaud, 5–7, 6–3, 7–5.
 Doubles:  Ruben Bemelmans &  Daniel Masur def.  Enzo Couacaud &  Blaž Rola, 7–6(7–2), 6–4.
 January 3 – 9: 2022 Traralgon International in  Traralgon
 Singles:  Tomáš Macháč def.  Bjorn Fratangelo, 7–6(7–2), 6–3.
 Doubles:  Manuel Guinard &  Zdeněk Kolář def.  Marc-Andrea Hüsler &  Dominic Stricker, 6–3, 6–4.
 January 10 – 16: 2022 Città di Forlì II in  Forlì
 Singles:  Jack Draper vs.  Jay Clarke, 6–3, 6–0.
 Doubles:  Sadio Doumbia &  Fabien Reboul def.  Nicolás Mejía &  Alexander Ritschard, 6–2, 6–3.
 January 17 – 23: 2022 Città di Forlì III in  Forlì
 Singles:  Pavel Kotov def.  Quentin Halys, 7–5, 6(5)–7(7), 6–3.
 Doubles:  Victor Vlad Cornea &  Fabian Fallert def.  Jonáš Forejtek &  Jelle Sels 6–4, 6–7(6–8), [10–7].
 January 17 – 23: 2022 Challenger Concepción in  Concepción
 Singles:  Daniel Elahi Galán def.  Santiago Rodríguez Taverna 6–1, 3–6, 6–3.
 Doubles:  Diego Hidalgo &  Cristian Rodríguez def.  Francisco Cerúndolo &  Camilo Ugo Carabelli 6–2, 6–0.
 January 24 – 30: 2022 Open Quimper Bretagne in  Quimper
 Singles:  Vasek Pospisil def.  Grégoire Barrère 6–4, 3–6, 6–1.
 Doubles:  Albano Olivetti &  David Vega Hernández def.  Sander Arends &  David Pel 3–6, 6–4, [10–8].
 January 24 – 30: 2022 Columbus Challenger in  Columbus
 Singles:  Yoshihito Nishioka def.  Dominic Stricker 6–2, 6–4.
 Doubles:  Tennys Sandgren &  Mikael Torpegaard def.  Luca Margaroli &  Yasutaka Uchiyama 5–7, 6–4, [10–5].
 January 24 – 30: 2022 Santa Cruz Challenger in  Santa Cruz de la Sierra
 Singles:  Francisco Cerúndolo def.  Camilo Ugo Carabelli 6–4, 6–3.
 Doubles:  Diego Hidalgo &  Cristian Rodríguez def.  Andrej Martin &  Tristan-Samuel Weissborn 4–6, 6–3, [10–8].
 January 31 – February 6: 2022 Cleveland Challenger in  Cleveland
 Singles:  Dominic Stricker def.  Yoshihito Nishioka 7–5, 6–1.
 Doubles:  William Blumberg &  Max Schnur def.  Robert Galloway &  Jackson Withrow 6–3, 7–6(7–4).
 February 7 – 13: 2022 Bengaluru Open in  Bangalore
 Singles:  Tseng Chun-hsin def.  Borna Gojo 6–4, 7–5.
 Doubles:  Saketh Myneni &  Ramkumar Ramanathan def.  Hugo Grenier &  Alexandre Müller 6–3, 6–2.
 February 7 – 13: 2022 Challenger La Manche in  Cherbourg-en-Cotentin
 Singles:  Benjamin Bonzi def.  Constant Lestienne 6–4, 2–6, 6–4.
 Doubles:  Jonathan Eysseric &  Quentin Halys def.  Hendrik Jebens &  Niklas Schell 7–6(8–6), 6–2.
 February 14 – 20: 2022 Bengaluru Open II in  Bangalore
 Singles:  Aleksandar Vukic def.  Dimitar Kuzmanov, 6–4, 6–4.
 Doubles:  Alexander Erler &  Arjun Kadhe def.  Saketh Myneni &  Ramkumar Ramanathan, 6–3, 6–7(4–7), [10–7].
 February 14 – 20: 2022 Città di Forlì IV in  Forlì
 Singles:  Jack Draper def.  Tim van Rijthoven, 6–1, 6–2.
 Doubles:  Victor Vlad Cornea &  Fabian Fallert def.  Antonio Šančić &  Igor Zelenay, 6–4, 3–6, [10–2].

Challenger 50
 January 3 – 9: 2022 Challenger de Tigre in  Buenos Aires
 Singles:  Facundo Díaz Acosta vs.  Santiago Rodríguez Taverna, 6–4, 6–2.
 Doubles:  Conner Huertas del Pino &  Mats Rosenkranz def.  Matías Franco Descotte &  Facundo Díaz Acosta, 0–0, 6–5, ret.
 January 3 – 9: 2022 Città di Forlì in  Forlì
 Singles:  Luca Nardi def.  Mukund Sasikumar, 6–3, 6–1.
 Doubles:  Marco Bortolotti &  Arjun Kadhe def.  Michael Geerts &  Alexander Ritschard, 7–6(7–5), 6–2.
 January 10 – 16: 2022 Aberto Santa Catarina de Tenis in  Blumenau
 Singles:  Igor Marcondes vs.  Juan Bautista Torres
 Doubles:  Boris Arias &  Federico Zeballos def.  Diego Hidalgo &  Cristian Rodríguez, 7–6(7–3), 6–1.

Teqball

2022 European Teqball Tour
 February 25 – 27: European Teqball Tour #1 in  Lisbon

2022 US Teqball Tour
 January 15 & 16: USA Teqball Tour #1 in  San Diego
 In the final,  Hugo Rabeux &  Julien Grondin def.  Bartłomiej Frańczuk &  Martin Csereklye, 2–1 (11–12, 12–8, 12–8).  Ádám Blázsovics &  Csaba Bányik took third place.

Triathlon

 February 3 – 6: 2022 World Triathlon Winter Championships and 2022 World Triathlon Winter Duathlon Championships in  Sant Julià de Lòria
 Winners:  Franco Pesavento (m) /  Anna Medvedeva (f)
 Duathlon winners:  Franco Pesavento (m) /  Anna Medvedeva (f)
 U23 winners:  Mattia Tanara (m) /  Julie Meinicke (f)
 U23 Duathlon winners:  Mattia Tanara (m) /  Julie Meinicke (f)
 Juniors winners:  Alvaro López Lucia (m) /  Victoria Nitteberg (f)
 Juniors Duathlon winners:  Alvaro López Lucia (m) /  Victoria Nitteberg (f)
 February 18 & 19: 2022 Europe Triathlon Winter Championships in  Rotzo
 Winners:  Pavel Andreev (m) /  Daria Rogozina (f)
 U23 winners:  Danila Egorov (m) /  Valeria Kuznetsova (f)
 Juniors winners:  Lukas Lanzinger (m) /  Kseniia Skvortsova (f)
 February 20: 2022 South American Triathlon Championships in  Villarrica
 Winners:  Manoel Messias (m) /  Luisa Baptista (f)
 February 26: 2022 Pan American Duathlon Championships in  Tocancipá
 Winners:  Camilo Duarte Escamilla (m) /  Jazmín Aguilar (f)
 U23 winner:  Hernando Córdoba
 Juniors winners:  Nicolás Gomez (m) /  Lilian Sofía Molina Marín (f)
 May 7: 2022 World Triathlon Middle Distance Duathlon Championships in  Viborg
 Winners:  Ondrej Kubo (m) /  Melanie Maurer (f)
 May 7: 2021 Ironman World Championship in  St. George
 Winners:  Kristian Blummenfelt (m) /  Daniela Ryf (f)
 June 6 – 12: 2022 World Triathlon Multisport Championships in  Târgu Mureș
 June 22 – 26: 2022 World Triathlon Sprint & Relay Championships in  Montreal
 October 6: 2022 Ironman World Championship in  Kailua-Kona
 October 28: 2022 Ironman 70.3 World Championship in  St. George

2022 World Triathlon Championship Series
 May 14 & 15: WTCS #1 in  Yokohama
 Winners:  Alex Yee (m) /  Georgia Taylor-Brown (f)

2022 World Triathlon Cup
 May 28: WTC #1 in  Arzachena
 Sprint winners:  Jonny Brownlee (m) /  Sandra Dodet (f)
 July 24: WTC #2 in  Pontevedra
 Winners:  Sergio Baxter (m) /  Petra Kuříková (f)

2022 Africa Triathlon Cup
 February 13: ATC #1 in  Maselspoort
 Winners:  Nicholas Quenet (m) /  Shanae Williams (f)

2022 Oceania Triathlon Cup
 February 26: OTC #1 in  Devonport
 Winners:  Matthew Hauser (m) /  Matilda Offord (f)

2022 Americas Triathlon Cup
 February 13: ATC #1 in  Viña del Mar
 Winners:  Manoel Messias (m) /  Luisa Baptista (f)
 February 20: ATC #2 in  Villarrica
 Winners:  Manoel Messias (m) /  Luisa Baptista (f)

Tug of war
 March 3 – 6: 2022 Tug of War World Indoor Championship in  Doetinchem
 September 14 – 18: 2022 Tug of War World Outdoor Championship in  Holten

Underwater sports
 June 20 – 26: 2022 Finswimming European Junior Championships in  Poznań
 June 25 – July 1: 2022 European Championships in Underwater Rugby in  Stavanger
 July 18 – 23: 2022 Finswimming Indoor World Championships in  Cali
 August 13 & 14: 2022 Freshwater Spearfishing European Championships in  Punkaharju
 August 28 – September 4: 2022 Underwater Orienteering European Championships in  Gyékényes
 September 12 – 17: 2022 Finswimming Open Water World Championships in  Viverone

2022 World Cup
 January 27 – 31: CMAS Finswimming World Cup "Pool and Open Water" in  Sharm el-Sheikh
 Canceled.
 February 25 – 27: Finswimming World Cup – Round Swimming Pool	in  Eger
 Winners:  Max Poschart (m) /  Dorottya Pernyész (f)
 Youth winners:  Larion Lipők (m) /  Dorottya Pernyész (f)
 Teams Champion:  Tomsk Oblast
 National Federations Champion:  Colombian Federation of Underwater Activities
 March 18 – 20: Finswimming World Cup – Round Swimming Pool in  Lignano Sabbiadoro
 April 1 & 2: FISU University World Cup Finswimming in  Lignano Sabbiadoro
 April 22 – 24: Finswimming World Cup – Round Swimming Pool in  Leipzig
 April 28 – May 1: World Spearfishing Cup Clubs in  Zadar
 May 13 – 15: Finswimming World Cup – Round Swimming Pool in  Coral Springs
 October 21 – 25: Finswimming World Cup – Round Swimming Pool in  Jiangle County (final)

University sports
FISU – FISU World University Championships – 2021 Summer World University Games

 FISU World University Championship Ski Orienteering Place: Jachymov, CZECH REPUBLIC 22–26 February 2022
 FISU World University Championship Speed Skating Place: Lake Placid, UNITED STATES OF AMERICA 2–5 March 2022
 FISU World University Championship Cross Country Place: Aveiro, PORTUGAL 12 March 2022
 FISU University World Cup Finswimming Place: Lignano Sabbiadoro, ITALY 1–2 April 2022
 FISU World University Championship Sport Climbing Place: Innsbruck, AUSTRIA 14–17 June 2022
 FISU University World Cup Floorball Place: Liberec, CZECH REPUBLIC 20–24 June 2022
 FISU University World Cup Handball Place: Pristina, KOSOVO 11–17 July 2022
 FISU World University Championship Futsal Place: Braga-Guimaraes, PORTUGAL 18–24 July 2022
 FISU World University Championship Golf Place: Torino, ITALY 20–23 July 2022
 FISU World University Championship Orienteering Place: Magglingen – Biel/Bienne, SWITZERLAND 17–21 August 2022
 FISU World University Championship Beach Volleyball Place: Lake Placid, UNITED STATES OF AMERICA 24–28 August 2022
 FISU World University Championship Triathlon Place: Maceio, BRAZIL 10–11 September 2022
 FISU World University Championship Mind Sports Place: Antwerp, BELGIUM 12–17 September 2022
 FISU World University Championship Canoe Sprint Place: Bydgoszcz, POLAND 16–18 September 2022
 FISU World University Championship Modern Pentathlon Place: Buenos Aires, ARGENTINA 21–25 September 2022
 FISU University World Cup Combat Sports 29 September −8 October 2022 Place : Moved from Russia to TBD
 FISU University World Cup 3x3 Basketball Place: Xiamen, CHINA (PEOPLE'S REPUBLIC OF) 20–23 October 2022
 FISU University World Cup Cheerleading Place: Heraklion (Creta), GREECE 4–6 November 2022
 FISU World University Championship Squash Place: New Giza, EGYPT 7–13 November 2022 5–9 December 2022

Others
 2022 FISU Volunteer Leaders Academy (Online) 17 June 2022
 International Day of University Sport (IDUS) 2022 IDUS 2022 20 September 2022
 FISU World Forum 2022 Place: Cartago, COSTA RICA

Cancelled
 FISU University World Cup American Football Place: Monterrey, MEXICO Cancelled
 FISU University World Cup Powerlifting Place: 25–29 July 2022 CANCELLED 
 FISU World University Championship Waterski & Wakeboard Place: 24–27 August 2022 CANCELLED

Volleyball

 May 31 – July 17: 2022 FIVB Volleyball Women's Nations League
 In the final,  def. , 3–0.
 June 6 – July 24: 2022 FIVB Volleyball Men's Nations League
 In the final,  def. , 3–2.

CEV
 September 22, 2021 – May 22: 2021–22 CEV Champions League
 In the final,  ZAKSA Kędzierzyn-Koźle def.  Itas Trentino, 3–0.
 September 21, 2021 – May 22: 2021–22 CEV Women's Champions League
 In the final,  VakıfBank Istanbul def.  A. Carraro Imoco Conegliano, 3–1.
 November 9, 2021 – March 23: 2021–22 CEV Cup
 In the final,  Vero Volley Monza def.  Tours VB, 3–0, 3–0.
 November 16, 2021 – March 22: 2021–22 Women's CEV Cup
 In the final,  Eczacıbaşı Dynavit def.  Allianz MTV Stuttgart, 3–1, 3–1.
 November 10, 2021 – March 22: 2021–22 CEV Challenge Cup
 In the final,  Narbonne Volley def.  Halkbank Ankara, 0–3, 3–1, [21–19].
 November 17, 2021 – March 23: 2021–22 CEV Women's Challenge Cup
 In the final,  Savino Del Bene Scandicci def.  Sanaya Libby's La Laguna, 3–0, 3–0.

Regional
 October 3, 2021 –: 2021– 2022 Baltic Volleyball League
 October 2, 2021 –: 2021– 2022 Baltic Volleyball League
 September 30, 2021 –: 2021–2022 MEVZA League
 October 6, 2021 –: 2021–2022 MEVZA Women's League

Water Polo

 July 30 – August 7: 2022 World Men's Youth Water Polo Championships in  Brisbane
 August 13 – 21: 2022 World Women's Youth Water Polo Championships in  Brisbane
 August 27 – September 10: 2022 European Water Polo Championship in  Split
 August 27 – September 10: 2022 Women's European Water Polo Championship in  Split
 September 18 – 25: 2022 LEN European U19 Water Polo Championship in  Podgorica

2022 FINA Water Polo World League  

 March 7 – 13: Intercontinental Cup in  Lima
Winers:  (m) /  (f)
 April 22 – 24: Europe Women's Final in  Santa Cruz
 April 28 – 30: Europe Men's Final in  Budapest
 July 23 – 29: Men's Super Final in  Strasbourg

LEN Champions League
 September 23, 2021 –: 2021–22 LEN Champions League
 September 30, 2021 –: 2021–22 LEN Euro Cup

Regional
 November 24, 2021 –: 2021–2022 Regional Water Polo League

Water Skiing & Wakeboarding

 July 25 – 30: 2022 World Wakeboard Championships in  Rieti

Weightlifting

 TBC: 2022 World Weightlifting Championships in  Chongqing

Wrestling

Wushu

References

 
Sports by year